= Reckoning (Smallville) =

- Smallville episode
- Jonathan dies in the arms of his son Clark and his wife Martha.
- Episode no.: Season 5 Episode 12
- Directed by: Greg Beeman
- Written by: Kelly Souders; Brian Peterson
- Production code: 2T6412
- Original air date: January 26, 2006
- Running time: 44 minutes

Guest appearance
- Terence Stamp as the Voice of Jor-El

Episode chronology
← Previous "Lockdown"	Next → "Vengeance"
- Smallville (season 5)

"Reckoning" is the twelfth episode of the fifth season of the superhero television series Smallville and the hundredth episode of the overall series. It originally aired on The WB in the United States on January 26, 2006, and on E4 in the United Kingdom on March 27 the same year. The episode was written by Kelly Souders and Brian Peterson, and directed by Greg Beeman. The series follows the adventures of the young Clark Kent (Tom Welling) in the town of Smallville, Kansas, before he becomes Superman. In this episode, Clark reveals his secret to Lana Lang (Kristin Kreuk), but there are consequences. Jonathan Kent (John Schneider) and Lex Luthor (Michael Rosenbaum) learn the results of the senatorial election and the life of someone Clark loves is taken from him.

There were originally two potential plotlines for the episode before it was decided that one of the main characters would be killed. This concept was positively received by studio executives. Schneider also approved of the idea, and compared his departure to that of John Wayne in The Cowboys. Jonathan Kent's death was used to emphasize the theme that Clark has to accept the consequences of his decisions. So as to keep Jonathan Kent's death a secret, the script was given to fewer people, and the network issued promotional trailers that featured the possible deaths of both Lana and Jonathan.

Upon its premiere, "Reckoning" earned a Nielsen household rating of 2.2, and was watched by approximately 6.28 million viewers in the United States, along with an estimated 375,000 viewers in the United Kingdom. The episode received generally positive reviews from commentators, who felt that Jonathan's death was both emotional and pivotal. One faction of fans was unhappy with the choice of Jonathan, however, as they would have preferred Lana dying instead.

== Plot ==
Clark Kent (Tom Welling) sits in his loft holding a piece of coal, waiting for Lana Lang (Kristin Kreuk) to arrive. Clark expresses fear that Lana is drifting away because of his secret, so he decides to reveal his powers to her. Clark takes her to the Kawatche Caves, where they are then transported to the Fortress of Solitude. Lana is in shock as she looks around at the Fortress. Clark then uses the coal to make a diamond ring and proposes marriage. Afterward, Clark reveals what he did to his parents, Jonathan and Martha Kent (John Schneider and Annette O'Toole), who tell him that he is old enough to make decisions on his own without the advice of his father. After some initial doubt, Lana returns to the Kent farm to accept Clark's proposal.

Lois Lane (Erica Durance) holds an election party for Jonathan at the Talon, where his supporters learn that he has defeated Lex Luthor (Michael Rosenbaum) in the Kansas State Senate race. Lana gets a call from Lex and meets him at his mansion. After seeing Lana's engagement ring, Lex realizes that Lana knows Clark's secret and reacts aggressively. Lana leaves, but Lex follows her in an attempt to apologize. Distracted, she does not see an approaching school bus; she strikes the bus with her car and is killed in the accident. Clark realizes that Lana's life is the price that Jor-El (Terence Stamp) promised to collect when he resurrected Clark in "Hidden". Jor-El then provides a crystal that will allow Clark to reset the day, but warns him that the universe will find someone else's life to exchange for Lana's. When Clark takes the crystal, he is sent back to the moment that Lana appeared in his barn. This time, Clark decides not to reveal his secret. Clark's hesitation leads to the two having a fight. Lana, distraught, tells Clark that she needs "a break" from their relationship. Upset, Clark goes to Metropolis and tells Chloe Sullivan (Allison Mack) everything, including how he had already lived the day, and his proposal to Lana. Chloe promises to keep an eye on Lana to prevent her from dying once more.

At the election party, Lana arrives with Chloe, but she once again leaves again when Lex calls. This time Lex kisses her when he learns of her fight with Clark, which causes Lana to leave. Like before, Lex pursues Lana, but this time Clark arrives in time to stop the bus. Jonathan goes to the farm after receiving a mysterious call during the party, and is greeted by Lionel Luthor (John Glover). Lionel insinuates he knows Clark's secret and shows a picture to Jonathan, which causes Jonathan to begin punching Lionel in anger. Jonathan dismisses Lionel and laboriously walks away, breathing heavily. Martha and Clark drive up and catch him as he has a heart attack. After taking a final look at his family, Jonathan dies in the arms of Martha and Clark. At Jonathan's funeral, all of Clark's close friends attend, as well as the Luthors. When the funeral is over, Clark picks up a handful of dirt and sprinkles it into his father's grave.

== Production ==
=== Writing ===
Originally, the writers developed two potential plotlines for the episode: one in which Clark and Lana would get married, and another in which one of Clark's parents would die. The producers eventually chose only to kill one of the parents. The producers also debated the idea of other characters dying, but realized that none would have as much resonance as one of Clark's parents. Once the basic plot was decided, a group of Smallville writers used whiteboards to flesh out the story, and the details were arranged. After the main story line was developed, the supervising producers presented it to several of the executive vice presidents at The WB Television Network. The executives enjoyed the story: Michael Roberts, a senior executive, called the episode's plot "great" and noted that "the conceit is really cool".

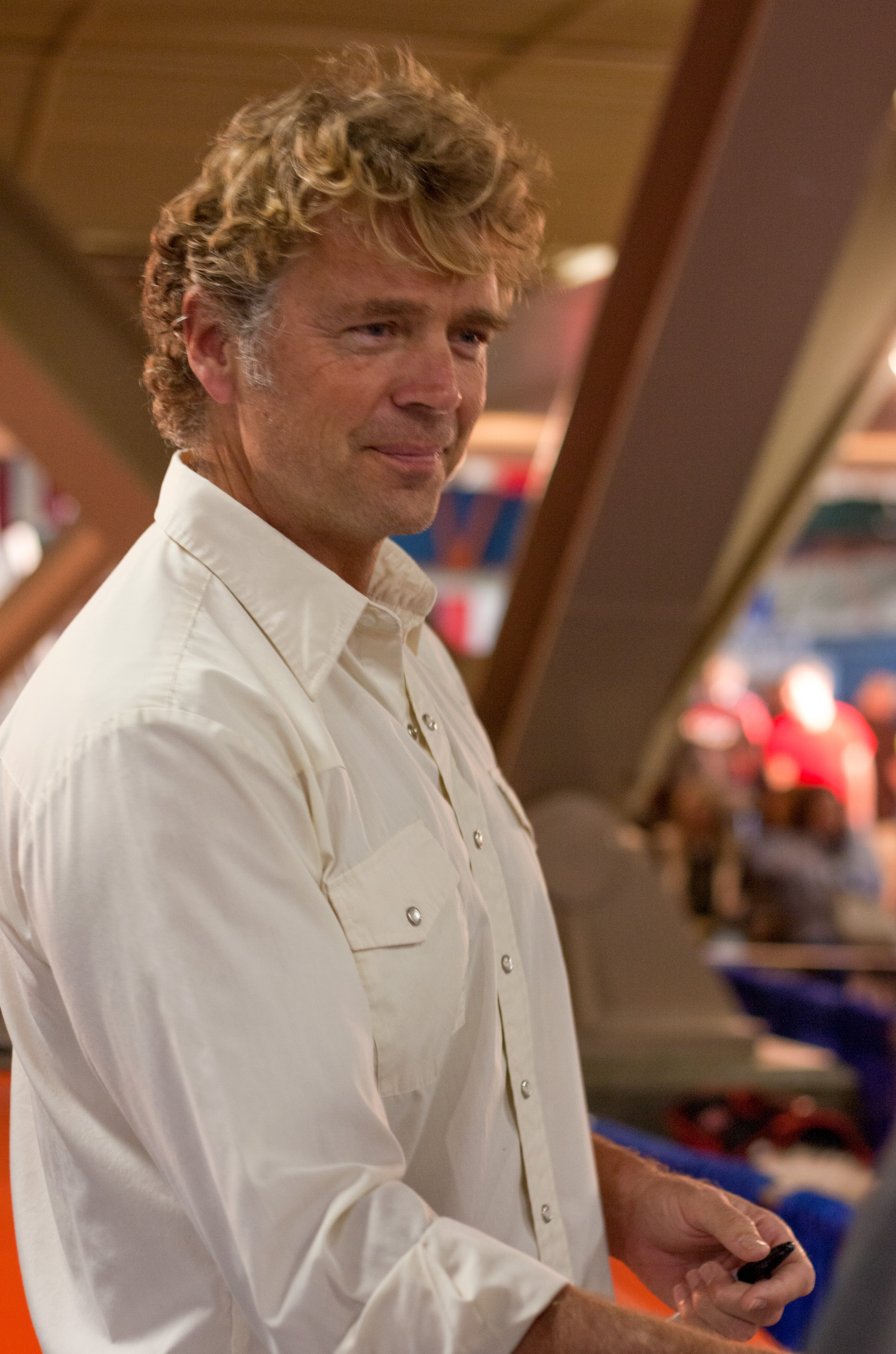
John Schneider, who portrayed Jonathan Kent, argued that his character left the show "like a hero".

According to writers Kelly Souders and Brian Peterson, "Reckoning" had been chosen as the episode's title before the script had been finalized. Peterson explained that the theme revolved around the idea that "you reap what you sow". This idea was an expansion of the theme from "Hidden", in which Clark was resurrected by his biological father Jor-El, only to be informed that the life of someone he loves would be exchanged in the future as payment for bringing Clark back. Peterson expounded further that the plot of the episode would show that "Clark is not God".

According to Souders, Jonathan Kent's death had been requested by executive producers Alfred Gough and Miles Millar at the "beginning of the season", and that the idea was specifically planned to be featured in the show's 100th episode. Gough explained that the reason Jonathan Kent was chosen to die was because "going into season five, this is the year the boy becomes the man, so at some point the mentor/father figure has to die, in order for Clark to ultimately step up and really embrace his destiny". Schneider was happy with how the show wrote Jonathan Kent's death, arguing that his character exited the show "like a hero". Furthermore, he drew comparisons to the death of John Wayne's character Wil Anderson in The Cowboys (1972), arguing that both were examples of "empowering death[s]". Originally, a scene had been shot featuring Clark bringing his father's dead body to the Fortress of Solitude, but the scene was ultimately cut because, according to Gough: "It was something that sounded great on paper, but it felt like a bit of a stutter step in the episode". Gough later called the scene "morbid".

Once the rough script was formulated it was sent to Gough and Millar for additional notes. Next, drafts were sent to the production studio and the network, who also made notes. Finally, Souders and Peterson re-wrote the episode; the script went through 10 drafts. The final version was finished "two-and-a-half [to] three weeks" before production began. Normally a script for a Smallville episode would go to about 40 different people, including "sets, props, and wardrobe", but because the episode featured the death of a major character, the production staff and writers kept it "top secret". In fact, the script for the episode was printed on red paper in an attempt to keep it "under wraps".

=== Filming ===
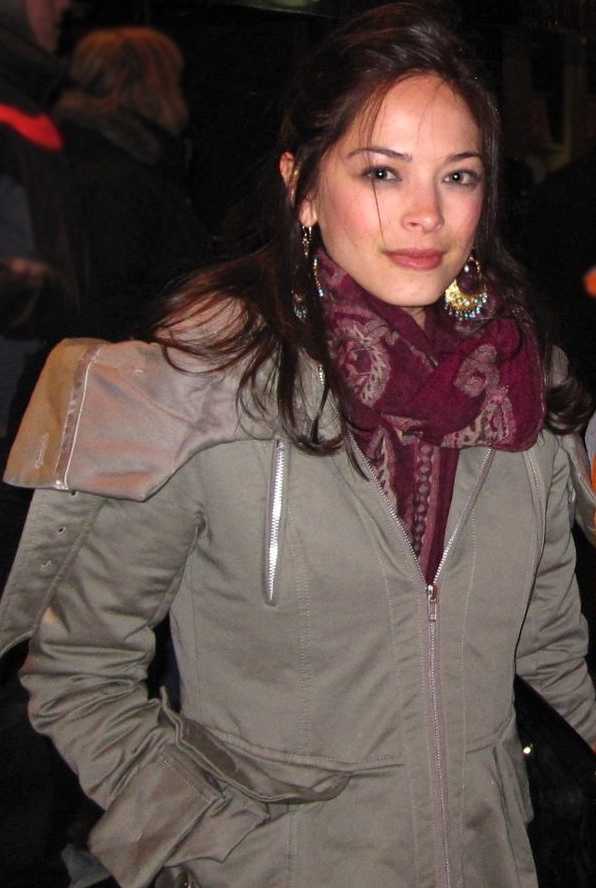
The scene featuring Lana's (Kristin Kreuk) death was carefully choreographed.

Director Greg Beeman found shooting the episode difficult because he had recently lost his father; he noted that he left from his funeral to go to Vancouver to direct the episode and thus "the emotions were very poignant" for him. Souders said that the production staff wanted the climactic scene of Lana's death to be a "big event". Originally, the show's producers wanted the car accident to be caused by a train, but the show was not able to afford the special effects to pull the scene off, and so, the sequence was re-written to feature a bus crash. Souders noted that if the show had been unable to afford the bus wreck, it would have been re-written into a "little car wreck". The Lana's entire sequence death was choreographed by Christopher Sayour—series stunt coordinator and Welling's stunt double. Sayour described the scene as "important to me and important to a lot of people". The car crash sequence itself was actually a collage of several different shots. First, Kreuk was filmed driving a car on a process trailer with a mounted camera. A separate shot was filmed with a stunt double driving a lead car that was attached to a dummy car driving down a road at high speed. A bus was then driven in a perpendicular direction. The dummy car was attached with a detonator so that when the bus hit it, it would detach and not pull the lead car with it, and the timing for the crash was practiced several times during rehearsals. Finally, after the car was smashed by the bus, Kreuk was positioned on the ground to give the effect that she was actually in the car wreck.

During filming, artificial snow had to be continuously shoveled on the sets because the cast and crew kept trampling through it. Steve Oben, the costume set supervisor for the series, jokingly called the Fortress of Solitude the "Fortress of Styrofoam" and explained that a huge hurdle for the scenes in the fortress was to make sure that the synthetic snow would not stick to the actors during filming.

== Broadcast and reception ==
"Reckoning" originally aired in the United States on January 26, 2006 on The WB. The network promoted the episode with videos of "snowy coffins" suggesting that either Lana or Jonathan would die. The episode earned a Nielsen rating of 2.2, meaning that roughly 2.2 percent of all television-equipped households were tuned in to the episode. It was viewed by 6.28 million viewers and ranked as the seventy-first most–watched episode of the week. The episode was the second-most watched fifth season episode, after the earlier entry, "Aqua", which was seen by 6.40 million viewers. It aired in the United Kingdom on E4 on March 27 the same year and reached 375,000 viewers, making it the fourth most–watched program that week.

"Reckoning" received mostly positive reviews from commentators. Various critics felt that the death of Jonathan Kent was a poignantly emotional choice, although others expressed their desire that Lang would have died. Michael Ausiello from TV Guide wrote positively of the episode, despite his admission that he was not a fan of Smallville. Vic Holtreman from Screenrant gave the episode a largely positive review and called it "a great episode overall". He called the scenes leading up to the funeral "quite moving" and noted that the loss of Jonathan Kent was a blow, not only for the series' main characters, but also for the audience itself. Omar Gallaga from Television Without Pity gave the episode a B– and wrote that the death of Jonathan Kent "still stings". Chris Carabott from TV Fanatic named the episode the second best Smallville episode (coming after ninth season entry "Absolute Justice"), and he wrote that "the death of Jonathan Kent is one of the most pivotal moments" of Smallville. Carabott also opined that the ramifications of the episode helped to "shape [Clark into] the man he has become". Michael Duffy, in the chapter "Sacrifice or Salvation? Smallville's Heroic Survival amid Changing Television Trends" of the book called The Smallville Chronicles: Critical Essays on the Television Series, called the episode "momentous". Furthermore, he argued that the presence of clips at Jonathan's funeral from "Reckoning" in the eighth season premiere "Odyssey" helped to "subtly resituate and creatively reboot the Smallville universe" during the show's later life.

The production staff for Smallville were very happy with the finished result. Gough and Millar wrote that the episode was a "tour de force of writing, directing, and acting". Allison Mack called the entry "thrilling and exciting". Producer Rob Maier was particularly proud of the final cut, noting that "the highlight of season five was the hundredth episode "Reckoning". It was a remarkable show". Welling, however, found that Schneider's departure from the series was "bittersweet".
