= List of Smallville characters =

The season four cast—(clockwise from left) Allison Mack, John Glover, Erica Durance, Jensen Ackles, Annette O'Toole, John Schneider, Michael Rosenbaum, Tom Welling and Kristin Kreuk—contains the characters who have been on the series the longest, with the exception of Ackles who left after one season.

Smallville is an American television series developed by writer/producers Alfred Gough and Miles Millar, and was initially broadcast by The WB. After its fifth season, The WB and UPN merged to form The CW, which was the second broadcaster for the show in the United States. The series features a regular cast of characters, which began with eight main characters in its first season. Since then, characters from that first season have left the series, with new main characters having been both written in and out of the series. In addition, Smallville features guest stars each week, as well as recurring guests that take part in mini story arcs that span a portion of a season. Occasionally, the recurring guest storylines will span multiple seasons.

The plot follows a young Clark Kent, in the fictional town of Smallville, Kansas, as he journeys toward becoming Superman. Additionally, the series chronicles Lex Luthor's path to the dark side, and his metamorphosis from Clark's best friend to greatest enemy. Smallville depicts the relationship between Clark and his first love interest, Lana Lang, as well as his relationship with Lois Lane, the woman he ultimately marries in the comic books. The series also features recurring appearances from other DC Universe characters, such as Arthur Curry and John Jones.

With five months devoted to casting for the pilot, Gough and Miller cast ultimately hired eight actors to take on the role of series regulars for the first season. Since then, only two characters from the first season have remained regulars through to the tenth season, with eight new actors taking on lead roles from seasons two through nine. Four of those new actors began as recurring guests in their first seasonal appearance, but were given top billing the following season. As the series progresses, recurring guests appear at various times to help move the overall storyline of the show or just provide a side-story arc for one of the main characters, such as Brainiac or Adam Knight. Other recurring guests appear as background characters, showing up for only a few scenes, which includes characters like Sheriff Nancy Adams or Dr. Virgil Swann.

== Main characters ==
According to co-creator Miles Millar, "unlike most shows, which pick up in January and you've got four weeks [...] to do your casting", Millar and co-creator Al Gough had five months to cast their lead characters. In October 2000, the two producers began their search for the three lead roles, and had casting directors in ten different cities. The following is a list of all the characters that are, or at one time were, a main character in the show. During its first season, Smallville had eight regular characters. Six characters from the original cast left the show, with eight new characters coming in over the course of nine seasons.

The following is a list of series regulars who appear in one or more of the series' ten seasons. The characters are listed in the order they were first credited in the series.

= Main cast (credited)
= Recurring cast (4+)
= Guest cast (1–3)

Character	Actor	Seasons									
Character	Actor	1	2	3	4	5	6	7	8	9	10
Clark Kent	Tom Welling	Main	Main	Main	Main	Main	Main	Main	Main	Main	Main
Lana Lang	Kristin Kreuk	Main	Main	Main	Main	Main	Main	Main	Recurring		
Lex Luthor	Michael Rosenbaum	Main	Main	Main	Main	Main	Main	Main			Guest
Whitney Fordman	Eric Johnson	Main	Guest		Guest						
Pete Ross	Sam Jones III	Main	Main	Main				Guest			
Chloe Sullivan	Allison Mack	Main	Main	Main	Main	Main	Main	Main	Main	Main	Main
Martha Kent	Annette O'Toole	Main	Main	Main	Main	Main	Main			Guest	Guest
Jonathan Kent	John Schneider	Main	Main	Main	Main	Main					Recurring
Lionel Luthor	John Glover	Recurring	Main	Main	Main	Main	Main	Main			Recurring
Jason Teague	Jensen Ackles				Main						
Lois Lane	Erica Durance				Recurring	Main	Main	Main	Main	Main	Main
Jimmy Olsen	Aaron Ashmore						Recurring	Main	Main		Guest
Kara	Laura Vandervoort							Main	Guest		Guest
Tess Mercer	Cassidy Freeman								Main	Main	Main
Davis Bloome	Sam Witwer								Main		
Oliver Queen	Justin Hartley						Recurring	Guest	Main	Main	Main
Zod	Callum Blue									Main	Guest

=== Clark Kent ===
Portrayed by Tom Welling, Clark Kent is an alien being from a planet called Krypton with superhuman abilities, which he uses to help others in danger. Clark is adopted by Jonathan and Martha Kent in the series pilot, when he crash lands to Earth as a three-year-old child. Twelve years later, he tries to find his place in life after being told he is an alien by his adoptive father. For most of the series, Clark spends his time running from his Kryptonian heritage, going as far as leaving Smallville, abandoning a quest his biological father Jor-El sends him on in search of three Kryptonian stones of knowledge, continuing his training at the Fortress of Solitude, and unwittingly unleashing a Kryptonian criminal from the Phantom Zone when he refuses to kill Lex.

=== Lana Lang ===
Portrayed by Kristin Kreuk, Lana Lang is one of Clark Kent's friends and on-again-off-again girlfriend. In the first season, Lana and Clark's friendship is just beginning, as she is dating Whitney Fordman during this time. After Whitney leaves for the Marines in the season one finale, Lana and Clark slowly begin to try to start a romantic relationship. In season seven, Lana leaves Smallville, leaving behind a DVD explaining to Clark that, even though she loves him, the only way for him to help the world to the best of his ability would be if she left him and Smallville for good.

=== Lex Luthor ===
Michael Rosenbaum portrays Lex Luthor, the son of billionaire Lionel Luthor, who is sent to Smallville to run the local fertilizer plant. After Clark saves his life in the pilot episode, the two become quick friends. Over the course of seven seasons—beginning on the day Clark rescues him from drowning—Lex tries to uncover the secrets that Clark keeps. Lex's curiosity eventually leads to a blowout between him and Clark in the season three finale. Lex's investigations ultimately lead to him discovering the truth about Clark's alien heritage in the season seven finale.

=== Whitney Fordman ===
Eric Johnson appears as Whitney Fordman, Lana's boyfriend, in season one. While initially friendly to Clark, he soon makes fun of Clark and Lana's budding friendship, going so far as to bully Clark in the series pilot. Whitney is forced to run the family business when his father is stricken with a heart disease in the episode "Shimmer". He ultimately loses his football scholarship, and in the episode "Kinetic" he starts ignoring Lana, and begins hanging around with past high school football stars, who recruit him for their illegal endeavors. He eventually reconciles with Clark and Lana before joining the Marines in the season one finale and leaving the show. Whitney has made a guest appearance in the season two episode "Visage", where it is revealed he died in combat overseas, and the season four episode "Façade", during a flashback of Clark's freshman year.

Eric Johnson auditioned for the roles of Lex and Clark, before finally being cast as Whitney Fordman. When the producers called him in for a third audition, Johnson informed them that if they wanted him then they would bring him in for a screen-test. After the screen-test, Johnson was cast and spent only one day filming his scenes for the pilot. The producers, along with Johnson, wanted to portray Whitney as more than just the "stereotypical jock" that he could have easily become, in an effort to make sure Lana did not look stupid for going out with him. Whitney was given multiple storylines in season one in an effort to get audiences to view the character in a more pleasant light, but Kristin Kreuk felt that it was all for naught, as the audience only sees him through Clark's eyes.

Johnson realized after reading the script for the pilot episode that his character was not going to be around for the entirety of the series. This became even clearer when his character's storylines began to develop quickly. While filming "Obscura", Johnson was informed that his character would not be returning as a series regular for season two. Initially fearing that he had made some mistake and that they were going to kill his character off, Johnson learned that Whitney would be enlisting into the Marines. The actor has expressed his pleasure in the way the writers handled Whitney's departure, by giving the character the exit of a hero.

=== Pete Ross ===
Sam Jones III plays Pete Ross, another of Clark's best friends. He hates the Luthors for what he sees as their thievery of his family's creamed corn business, and is the first person Clark voluntarily informs of his secret. It is established in season three's "Truth", that Pete is in love with Chloe. He kept this truth to himself because of the Clark–Lana–Chloe love triangle already taking place. In season three's "Velocity", Pete, feeling alienated by Clark, begins hanging around a group of street racers. When Pete refuses to throw a race, his life is put in jeopardy, and he forces Clark to abuse his powers in order to help Pete win a race. This leads to a falling out between the two friends. The character was written out of the series at the end of season three, citing the trouble keeping Clark's secret was causing him. Pete returns to Smallville in season seven's "Hero", after gaining superhuman abilities from kryptonite-enhanced chewing gum, which allow him to stretch his body to extreme lengths. It is revealed that Pete initially blames Clark for his life not turning out the way he intended. Lex learns about Pete's powers and blackmails him into abusing his powers for Lex's personal gain. Clark steps in and saves Pete, and the pair mend their relationship before Pete leaves Smallville again, setting out to get his life in order.

Sam Jones III was the last of the season one series regulars to be cast—being hired just four days before filming for the pilot episode began. Jones, who is African American, was also cast against the Superman mythology, where Pete Ross is Caucasian. Jones has stated that he would have understood if the producers had simply created a black character for him to portray, but the fact that they chose to go with him, even though the character has always been white, gave him more honor to be a part of the show. During the first season, Jones felt like he should have more screen time, but later conceded that the show was about Clark's journey and that the other characters are there to help his story move along.

"I know that I told you keeping your secret wasn't hard. But I lied. I walk around every day afraid that I'm going to slip up".
— The stress of knowing Clark's secret first appears in season two's "Ryan". This idea became the ultimate story arc for the character in season three, which led to him leaving Smallville.

Jones was not alone in his wish to get more screen time; the writers, who were reading Internet forums and receiving mail from the audience that requested the same thing, decided that Pete would learn Clark's secret in season two. The creative team hoped that knowing Clark's secret would allow the character to be written into more scenes, and become involved on a daily basis with the Kent family. Ultimately, Pete's primary story arc in season three became the character's inability to deal with knowing Clark's secret, and his growing feeling of abandonment from Clark, who was spending more time with Chloe, Lana and Lex. Millar explains that they felt that the character was being wasted on Smallville, and that led to the decision of writing the character off the show with the hope that he could come back in future episodes. There was dissension between the cast and crew over Jones's departure. According to Annette O'Toole (Martha Kent), Clark needs a guy friend in his life, and she feels that the Kents would have taken Pete in when his parents left Smallville. Though Gough does not disagree that writing out Pete Ross was the best thing, he does feel that his exit could have gone better. According to Gough, Pete's departure felt rushed, and seemed to lack the importance that it should have had.

=== Chloe Sullivan ===
Allison Mack portrays one of Clark's best friends, Chloe Sullivan. Editor of the school newspaper, her journalistic curiosity—always wanting to "expose falsehoods" and "know the truth"—causes tension with her friends, especially when she is digging into Clark's past. She discovers Clark's secret in the fourth-season episode "Pariah".

=== Martha Kent ===
Martha Kent, Clark's adopted mother, is portrayed by Annette O'Toole. Martha, along with her husband Jonathan, gives Clark sage advice about how to cope with his growing abilities. In season two, Martha becomes pregnant with her first child—in the season two episode "Fever", Clark's spaceship heals her body and allows her to have children, something she physically could not do when she adopted Clark—but in season two's finale she suffers a miscarriage after an automobile accident. In order to help the family financially, Martha takes a job as Lionel Luthor's assistant in season two, but quits her job the same season in the episode "Suspect" for undisclosed reasons. She eventually takes over management duties at the local coffee shop, the Talon, in season four. She continues to manage the Talon into season five until Jonathan dies from a heart attack, which ultimately leads to her taking his state senate seat at the request of the Kansas Governor in season five's "Tomb". This eventually paves the way to a job in Washington, D.C. in season six's "Prototype", and the character's exit from the show. Martha would return in the season nine episode "Hostage", where it is revealed that she has been going under the code name "Red Queen" of Checkmate while she attempts to keep Clark off of the government agency Checkmate's radar. She ultimately leaves Clark with a means to send the season's threat, cloned Kryptonians, to another plane of existence. In the season nine finale, it is revealed that before Martha traveled back to Washington, D.C. she left Clark a new costume to wear while he defends Earth.

"I have the feeling that she didn't have a mother growing up—they've never introduced a mother for her. That's why being a mother is so important to her—and being the 'picture book' kind of mother at that".
— Annette O'Toole on Martha Kent's parenting.

The role of Martha Kent was originally given to Cynthia Ettinger, but during filming everyone, including Ettinger, realized that she was not right for the role. O'Toole was committed to the television series The Huntress when Ettinger was filming her scenes for the pilot. Around the time the creators were looking to recast the role of Martha Kent The Huntress was canceled, which allowed O'Toole the chance to join the cast of Smallville. Coincidentally, the actress had previously portrayed Lana Lang in Superman III. O'Toole thinks that the producers wanted someone older for the role of Martha, and when she came in to talk to the producers everyone appeared to be on the same page with what the character and the show should be about. O'Toole characterizes Martha as really intelligent, but believes the character has to hide her intelligence at times "to keep the peace".

Feeling like her character was wasting her college degree O'Toole suggested to the producers that Martha go to work for Lex during the second season. The producers agreed, but altered the concept so that Martha went to work for Lionel, and that she would use this new position to spy on Lionel and find out what he knows about Clark. Disappointed when the storyline ended quickly into the second season, O'Toole hoped that the secret her character was holding in "Ryan" was that Martha was going to run for Mayor. In O'Toole's opinion, Martha needs some form of outlet for intelligence. To the chagrin of O'Toole, Martha's next storyline—the expectation of a new child—tied the character to the farm in a way the actress did not agree with. O'Toole wanted to perform as if the pregnancy was fake—something mentally created by Clark's ship—but the producers insisted that she wear the pregnancy pads to indicate that she was indeed pregnant. Ultimately, that storyline ended with Martha losing the baby to a miscarriage. Before season four began, O'Toole suggested again to the producers that Martha go to work for Lex. O'Toole had enjoyed the moments in the show when she was working for Lionel, because it gave her character something more to do, and she wanted to do that again for season four. The producers took her suggestion and had Martha take a job at the Talon, which was owned by Lex, and which O'Toole felt allowed Martha to interact more with the other characters in Clark's life.

O'Toole relished the opportunity that came with Jonathan's passing, even though she was saddened to see a friend leave the show. Martha taking the senate seat was a chance to explore more adult stories with her character beginning midway through season five, which was important for the actress since Clark was becoming an adult on the show. It also allowed for O'Toole the chance to depict "strong emotions" over Jonathan's death. Al Gough feels that Jonathan's passing allowed for them to explore more of Martha's smart and strong side, as well as her relationship with Lionel. The idea was to show that there was some form of attraction between Martha and Lionel, but that Martha would never have any romantic relationship with the billionaire, especially after all that he had done to her family. O'Toole likens Martha's interest in Lionel with that of watching a dangerous animal: "It's that attraction you have for a very beautiful, dangerous animal. You know you can't stop watching it, but at the same time you feel, 'Oh my God, he's going to kill me'". The actress believes that Martha's ultimate motivation was to get close enough to Lionel to know what he is planning to do to Clark. When it came time for Martha to leave the show, writer Todd Slavkin contends that they wanted to give the character "more of a send-off" than they achieved on film. Slavkin explains that they could not do anything equivalent to what they gave John Schneider, as there were already so many storylines going on by the season six finale that they could not fit anything else in. The writers also realized that they could not kill off the character, and so chose to send her to the US Senate, creating a parallel to Clark where Martha fights injustice on the political stage.

=== Jonathan Kent ===
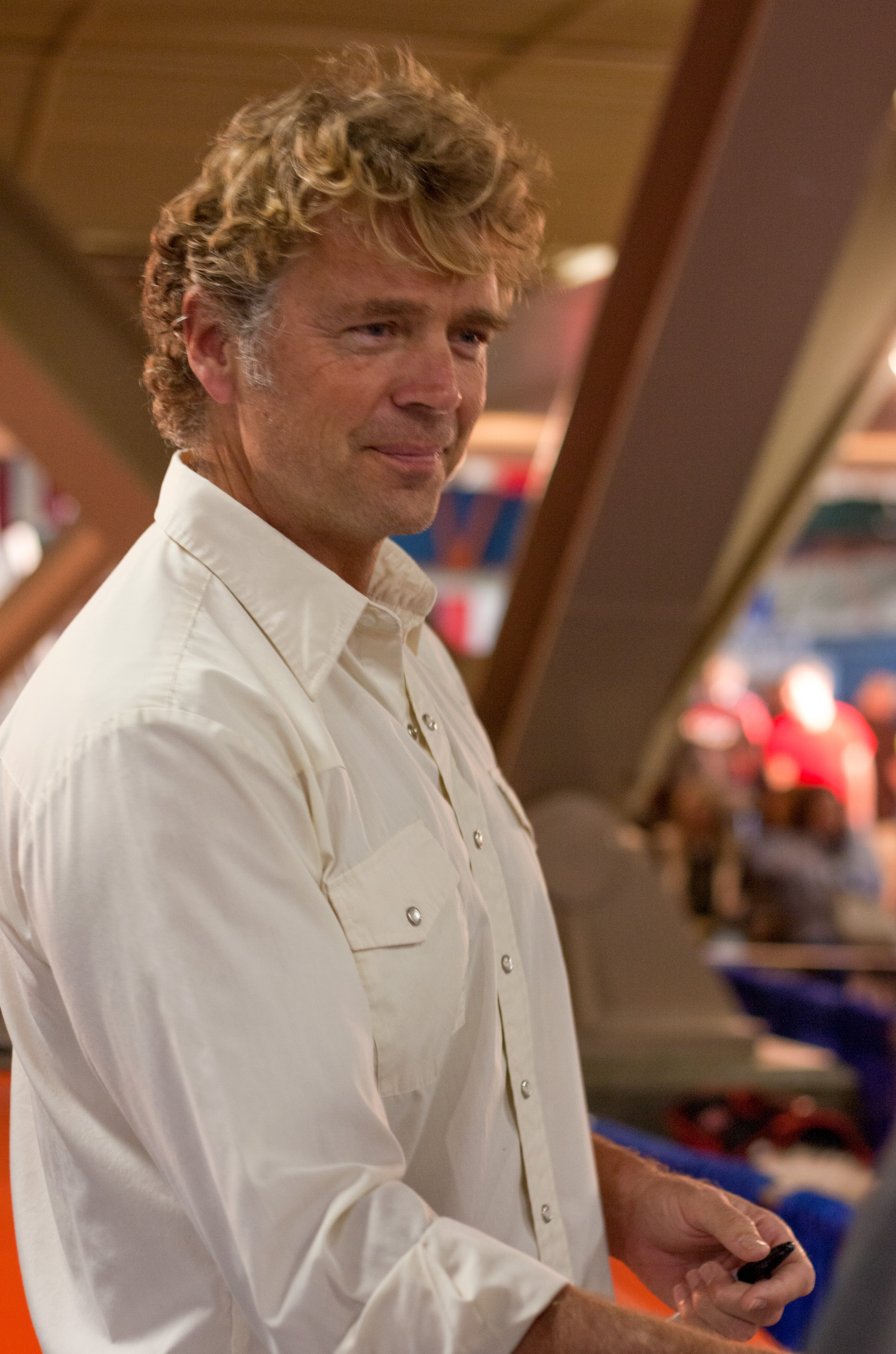
John Schneider's background portraying Bo Duke on The Dukes of Hazzard led to him landing the role of Jonathan Kent. Schneider performed the role for five seasons, before his character was killed off in a scene reminiscent of Glenn Ford's death as Jonathan Kent in Richard Donner's Superman.

John Schneider portrays Jonathan Kent, Martha's husband and Clark's adopted father. He goes to great lengths to protect his son's secret, which includes: almost killing a reporter, in the season two premiere, who was going to expose Clark's secret to the world, and making a deal to allow Clark's biological father, Jor-El, to take Clark to fulfill his destiny if Jor-El gave Jonathan the power to bring Clark home—Clark had run away after believing his parents blamed him for Martha's miscarriage. As a result, season three's "Hereafter" explains that Jonathan's heart was strained while he was imbued with all of Clark's powers. In season five, Jonathan decides to run for a seat in the Kansas Senate against Lex Luthor. In the season five episode "Reckoning", Jonathan wins the senatorial seat, but after a physical altercation with Lionel Luthor, who he believed was trying to exploit Clark's abilities, Jonathan suffers a fatal heart attack.

Millar and Gough loved the idea of casting John Schneider as Jonathan Kent, as they felt he gave the show a recognizable face from his days as Bo Duke from The Dukes of Hazzard. Gough felt that Schneider's experience portraying Bo Duke added belief that he could have grown up running a farm. Schneider was initially uninterested, but after reading the pilot script he saw the potential for bringing back "real parenting" to television. Schneider particularly saw his character as a means to replace the "goof" father-figures that had become prevalent on television. He also saw his character as a means to keep the show grounded in reality, specifically by making sure that Jonathan's life is clearly displayed for the audience, by performing a daily routine on the farm.

According to Schneider, Jonathan is "perfectly willing to go to jail, or worse, to protect his son". The actor characterizes Jonathan as fast to lose his temper, which Schneider views as being a development of his protective nature over his family. Schneider believes that the season two episode "Suspect"—where Jonathan is arrested, but his sole concern is protecting Clark's secret—summarizes the character well, and shows that the "least important person in Jonathan's life is Jonathan". Schneider admits that occasionally he and Annette O'Toole have to "police" the creative team when it comes to the relationship between Martha, Jonathan, and Clark. According to Schneider, there are moments where they have to make sure that the characters are not taken to a place they would not normally go, specifically where the parents are useless without the "innate intelligence of [their] teenager".

Tom Welling feels that the deal Jonathan made with Jor-El at the beginning of season three made Jonathan realize that he will not always be around to protect Clark. Welling believes that it is the repercussions of that deal that allow Jonathan to give Clark more freedom in the choices that he makes during season three. Jonathan realizes that he must help Clark find the confidence in his ability to survive on his own, so that he can leave home one day. One scene that Schneider specifically remembers was at the end of season three's "Forsaken". Here, Jonathan admits to not trusting his own instincts anymore and allowing Clark to rely on his. This "admission of fallibility", but faith in his son's ability to make the right choices, is what Schneider sees as the growing of the family dynamic.

For season three, Jonathan also has to deal with his emerging heart problems. For Schneider, the "treatments" and "cures" that his character underwent were all for nothing, as the actor believes that Jonathan's heart attack at the end of "Hereafter" was less of a real heart attack and more of Jor-El trying to get Jonathan's attention. A heart condition is not new to the character, as it has been used in previous incarnations, like Glenn Ford's portrayal of Jonathan Kent in Richard Donner's Superman, as well as the comic books. In contrast to those versions, it was Smallville that tied his heart condition to a deal that he makes with Jor-El. When the moment came for his character to die, Schneider considers the event an "empowering death", which he likens to John Wayne's character death as Wil Andersen in The Cowboys.

=== Lionel Luthor ===
John Glover portrays Lex's father, Lionel Luthor. Lionel initially sends his son to Smallville to run the local fertilizer plant, as a test. When Lex succeeds in making a profit for the first time in years, Lionel closes the plant down completely and blames it on Lex's poor managerial skills. As the series progresses, Lionel becomes interested in the Kawatche caves, which have Kryptonian symbols painted on their walls; his interests also extend to the secrets Clark keeps. After being possessed by Jor-El in the season five episode "Hidden", Lionel begins assisting Clark in keeping his secret hidden from Lex. In season seven, Lionel is murdered by Lex, who realizes that his father has been covering up the truth about an alien visitor.

=== Jason Teague ===
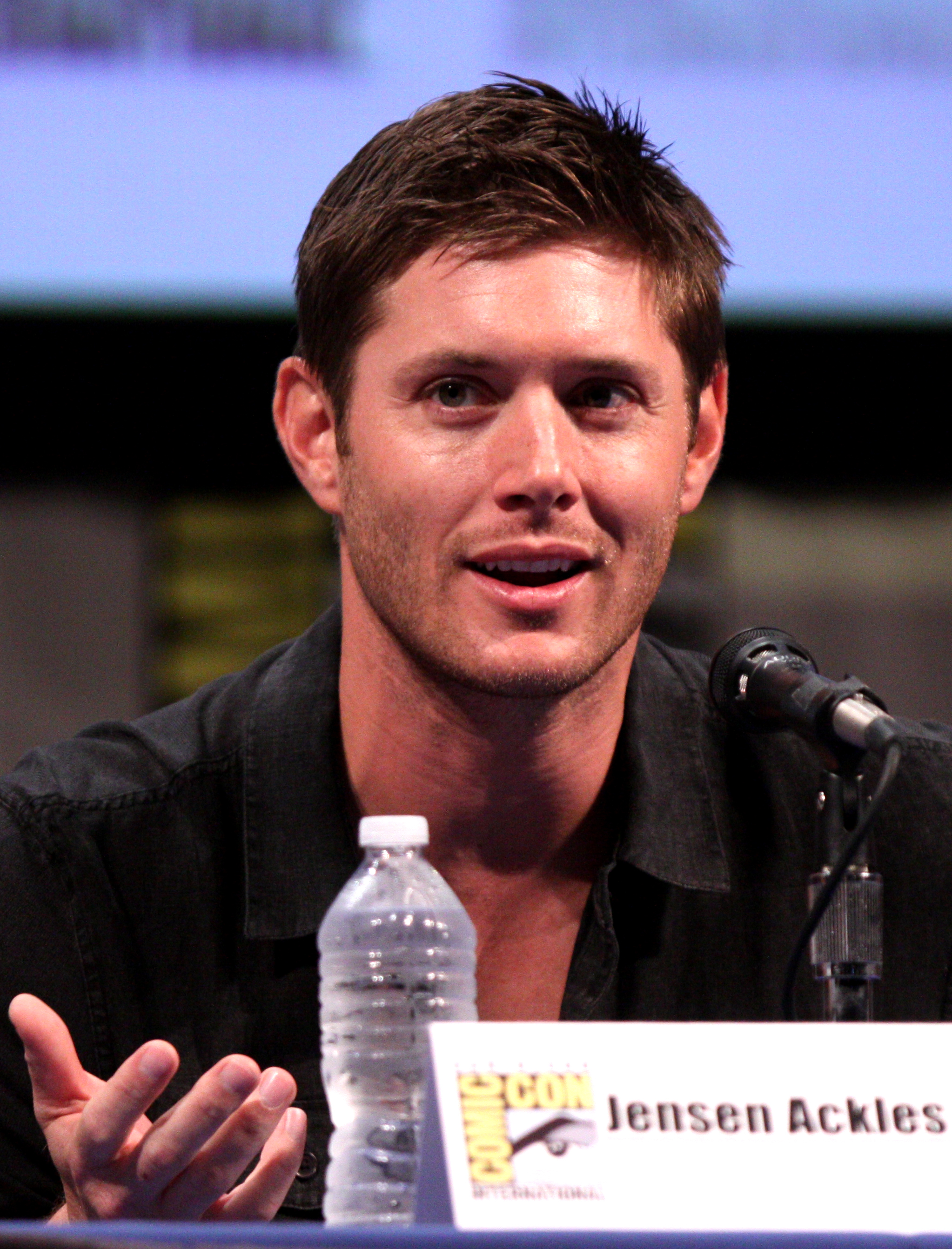
Actor Jensen Ackles, who portrayed Jason Teague on the show, at Comic-Con 2011.

Jensen Ackles appears in season four as Jason Teague, a love interest for Lana. The pair meet in Paris, while Lana is studying abroad. When she leaves unexpectedly in the season four episode "Gone", Jason follows Lana back to Smallville and takes a position as the school's assistant football coach. In season four's "Transference", Jason is fired from the school when his relationship with Lana comes to light. By the end of the fourth season, it is revealed that he has been working with his mother Genevieve (Jane Seymour) to locate the three stones of knowledge — three Kryptonian stones that when united form a single crystal that creates Clark's Fortress of Solitude. The Teagues kidnap Lex and Lionel in an effort to discover the location of one of the stones in the episode "Forever", with Lionel claiming that Lana has one of the stones. In the season four finale, Genevieve confronts Lana, and the two women get into a struggle with Genevieve dying by Lana's hand. Jason, who believes that the secret of the stones lies with Clark, heads to the Kent farm where he holds Jonathan and Martha hostage. He is killed during the second meteor shower, when a meteor falls through the Kent home and lands on him.

The creation of Jason Teague was something handed down by the network, who wanted Lana to have a new boyfriend—one who was "different from Clark". Gough and Millar were apprehensive because they were already introducing Lois Lane into the series, and introducing two new characters would be difficult. The pair thought about where the relationship between Clark and Lana had left off at the end of season three, and they realized that Clark had turned his back on Lana. Gough and Millar began to like the idea of bringing in a new character, one that would create a new love triangle; eventually they tied him into the larger storyline involving the three Kryptonian stones of knowledge.

According to writer Brian Peterson, where Clark brings "angst" and "depth" to his relationship with Lana, Jason is designed to bring "joy", "levity", and "fun". On the topic of Jason's relationship with Lana, Ackles believes the character did love Lana, because he saw an innocence in her that had not been able to experience growing up in the upper class society; Jason grew up having to question the actions of his mother, and with Lana he had the opportunity to experience an honest relationship. Ackles was Gough and Millar's first choice to play Jason Teague, as the actor had been the runner up for the role of Clark Kent when they were casting for the pilot. Ackles was contracted to remain through season five, but was written out of the show in the season four finale, which, according to Ackles, was due to his commitments to the WB's new series Supernatural. Gough contends that Supernatural did not alter any of their plans, and that Jason Teague was intended to be a single season character.

=== Lois Lane ===
Erica Durance first appears in season four as Chloe's cousin, Lois Lane. Lois comes to Smallville investigating the supposed death of Chloe, staying with the Kents while she is in town. In season five's "Fanatic", Lois takes a job as Jonathan's Chief of Staff when he runs for state senate; she continues these duties when Martha takes Jonathan's place following his death. After some reservation, Lois decides that she is interested in journalism and takes a job at a tabloid newspaper called The Inquisitor. This eventually lands her a position at the Daily Planet.

=== Jimmy Olsen ===
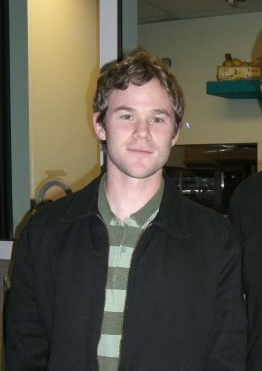
Aaron Ashmore, whose twin had also appeared on the show, joined the cast as a recurring guest in the sixth season. When he returned in the seventh season, he had been promoted to series regular status.

Jimmy Olsen is first mentioned in season four as the person Chloe lost her virginity to while interning at the Daily Planet. He makes his official appearance, portrayed by Aaron Ashmore, in the season six opener. Working as a photographer for the Daily Planet, Jimmy rekindles his relationship with Chloe in the season six episode "Wither". In the episode "Hydro", Jimmy works with Lois to uncover the true identity of Green Arrow, and in season seven, when Lois is hired by the Daily Planet, the pair work together on finding stories for the paper. In the season seven episode "Sleeper", Jimmy falls into Lex's debt when Lex, at Jimmy's request, keeps Chloe from being arrested by the Department of Domestic Security for hacking into their government files. In the season seven finale, Lex goes back on his word and has Chloe arrested, just as Jimmy proposes marriage.

After being saved by Oliver Queen and Clark in the season eight premiere, Chloe is reunited with Jimmy and accepts his marriage proposal. In "Committed", a deranged jeweler kidnaps Jimmy and Chloe after their engagement party and subjects them to a torturous test to see if they truly love each other—they both pass and are allowed to return to their normal lives. In the season eight episode "Identity", Jimmy begins to suspect that Clark is the "Good Samaritan", an individual who has been stopping crimes and saving people's lives around Metropolis, until Oliver Queen dresses up as the "Good Samaritan" to help Clark trick Jimmy into believing he was mistaken. In the eighth-season episode "Bride", Jimmy and Chloe are officially married, but Doomsday crashes their wedding and kidnaps Chloe, leaving Jimmy in the hospital because of injuries sustained from Doomsday. In "Turbulence", Jimmy witnesses Davis Bloome murdering someone, but when he tries to warn people Davis drugs him and makes it appear as though he is hallucinating. Eventually, Jimmy ends his marriage to Chloe after getting fed up with her always taking Davis's side. In the season eight finale, Davis murders Jimmy after learning that Chloe is still in love with her ex-husband, and was never in love with him.

Ashmore indicates that his casting was both a surprise and what he wanted. The actor states: "I auditioned for [the role] and I put myself on tape. I hadn't heard anything, and a couple of weeks later, all of the sudden, I got the call saying, 'You're going to Vancouver to start shooting Smallville.' It's a dream come true, really". Aaron Ashmore's twin, Shawn, who is better known as Bobby "Iceman" Drake in the X-Men film series, appeared in two episodes of Smallville as the power leeching Eric Summers and had been considered for the part of Jimmy Olsen in Superman Returns. After three seasons with the show, two as a series regular, Ashmore was written out of the series. According to Ashmore, when the producers were first trying to get permission to use the character on Smallville, DC Comics had qualms over how close Jimmy was in age to Clark and Lois, as the character was supposed to be at least ten years younger. The producers guaranteed the department they would eventually reveal the Jimmy Olsen who appeared on the show was not the Jimmy Olsen who would one day work alongside Clark and Lois. At the character's funeral, his full name is shown to be "Henry James Olsen", and it is alluded that Jimmy's younger brother, who is given a brief appearance at the funeral, is the DC Comics version of Jimmy Olsen who will one day work at the Daily Planet with Clark and Lois. Although Ashmore was sad to leave the show, he feels that the redemptive story that was given to Jimmy in the finale, through the self-sacrifice he makes for Chloe, makes a good send off for his character.

=== Kara ===
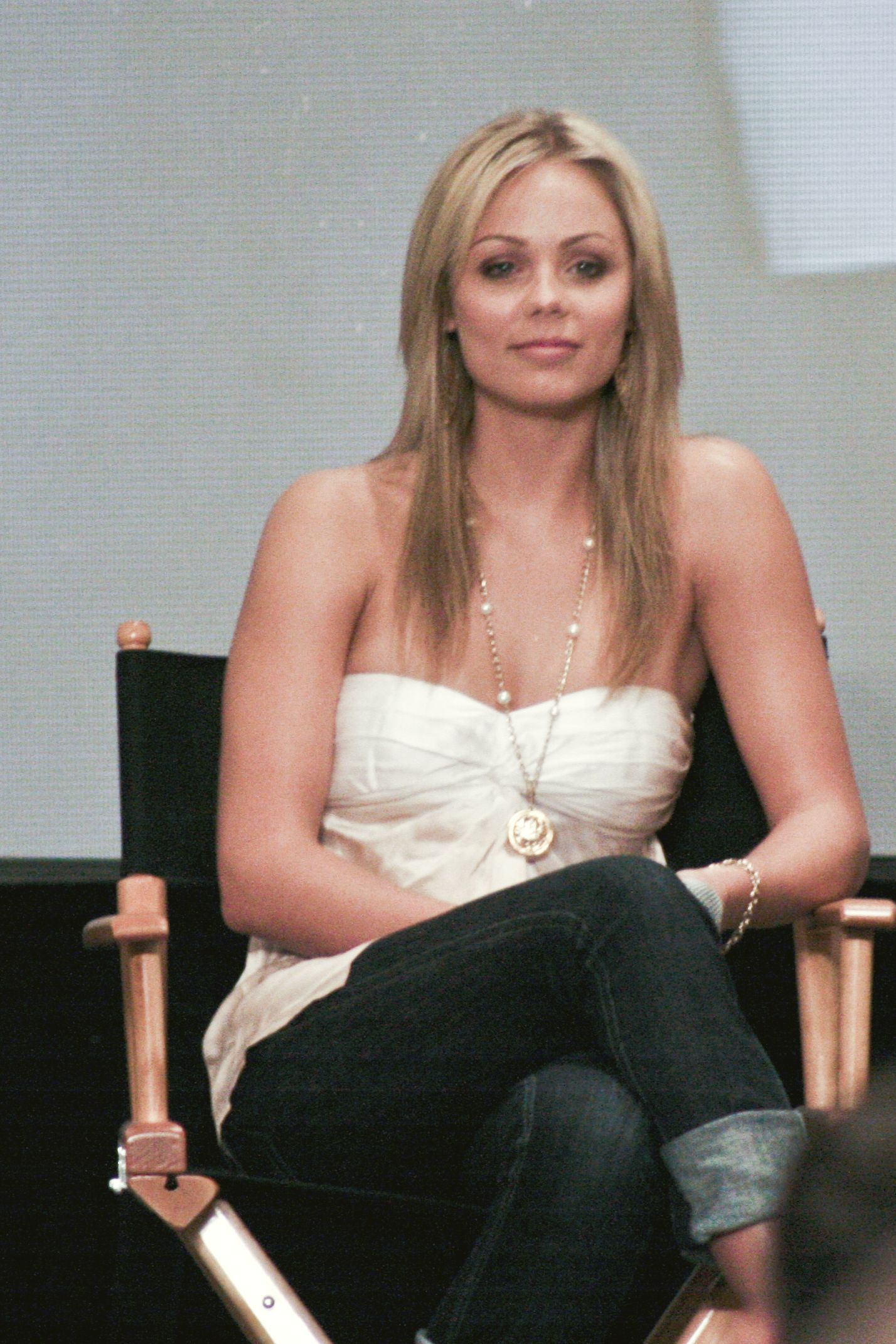
Laura Vandervoort joined the cast of Smallville in season seven as Clark's biological cousin Kara, but was written out of the series in the season seven finale.

Laura Vandervoort joined the cast in season seven as Kara, Clark's Kryptonian cousin. She arrived on Earth at the same time as Clark, with the mission to protect her cousin, but was stuck in suspended animation for eighteen years. In the season seven premiere, Kara is released from suspended animation and saves Lex from drowning. A brief glimpse of Kara flying into the sky results in Lex's new obsession with finding the "angel" that saved his life. Kara eventually finds Clark, in the episode "Kara", who informs her that Krypton was destroyed when the two of them were sent to Earth, and everyone there is dead. Clark teaches Kara to control some of her abilities, and at the same time blend into society while building a familial relationship with her. In season seven's "Lara", Kara is captured by the Department of Domestic Security and tortured, where she relives one of her early memories of visiting Earth with Clark's mother, Lara. She realizes that her perceptions of her father were wrong and that he was as evil as Clark said. Kara and Clark work together to fight her father, Zor-El, who was unwittingly released when Clark attempted to create a clone of his biological mother in the episode "Blue". When Zor-El is destroyed at the end of the battle, Kara disappears from the Fortress of Solitude. She awakens in Detroit with amnesia and none of her abilities.

In the episode "Fracture", Kara is discovered and brought home by Lex, who wants to exploit her amnesia to his benefit, with the intent of discovering the truth about Clark. In season seven's "Traveler", Chloe convinces Jor-El to return Kara's memory and powers before Lex can learn her and Clark's secret. When Lana is placed in a catatonic state by Brainiac in the episode "Veritas", Kara agrees to cooperate with him in the hope that he will not kill Lana. In "Apocalypse", Kara is taken through time to Krypton, just before it explodes, so that Brainiac can kill the infant Clark. With Jor-El's help, Clark manages to arrive on Krypton and stop Brainiac. Unknown to Clark, Brainiac is not killed in their fight on Krypton, and he manages to place Kara in the Phantom Zone, while he assumes her identity back on Earth. In the season eight episode "Bloodline", Clark is transported to the Phantom Zone, where he finds Kara. Working together they escape, and Kara leaves Earth to search for Kandor, a city rumored to hold surviving citizens of Krypton.

Vandervoort does not return as a series regular for the eighth season, but returns as a guest star in the season eight episode "Bloodline", and season ten episodes "Supergirl" and "Prophecy".

=== Tess Mercer ===
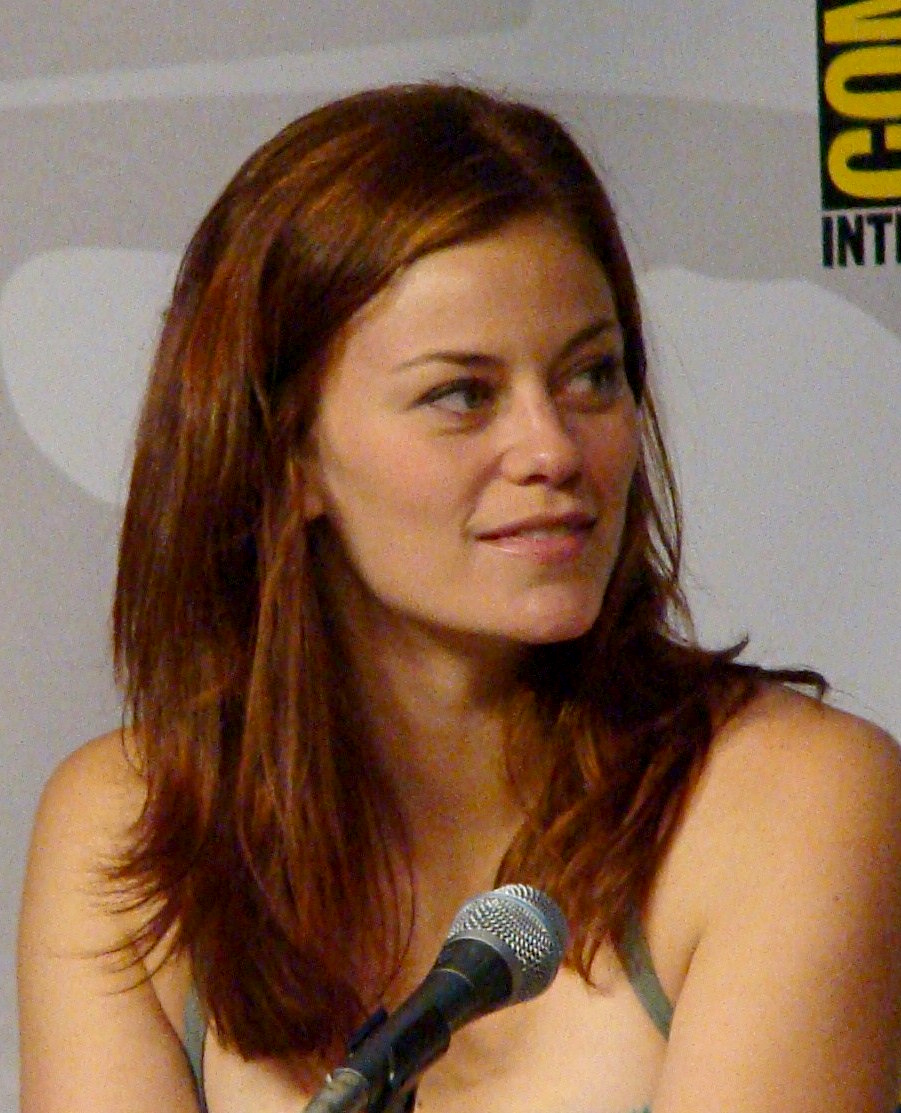
Cassidy Freeman, who portrays Tess Mercer on the show, at the 2009 San Diego Comic-Con.

Cassidy Freeman portrays Tess Mercer, the acting CEO of LuthorCorp, who is Lex Luthor's protégé tasked to run the company should something ever happen to him. The character is loosely based on Lena Luthor from the comics, and the name "Tess Mercer" is a homage to two female characters from Superman lore, Eve Teschmacher and Mercy Graves, who are both Lex's henchwomen. As Freeman describes her character, Tess Mercer is Lex's handpicked successor; she is "fierce", "fun" and "intelligent".

Debuting in season eight, Tess Mercer's primary goal is finding the missing Lex, which draws her inquisitively to Clark, who she believes will be able to help her find Lex. Tess's first contact with Clark is when he pulls her from a wrecked city bus in the episode "Plastique"; she immediately suspects that Clark is not telling her all that he knows about Lex's disappearance. That same episode reveals that Tess is bringing together a group of meteor-infected individuals, and in "Plastique" she recruits Bette, a young girl with the power to create combustion and explosion remotely. In the episode "Prey", Tess enlists a young man who can turn himself into a shadow. In "Toxic", it is revealed that Tess had a prior romantic relationship with Oliver Queen after she saved his life while he was stranded on an island, but broke up bitterly when he cheated on her.

In the season eight episodes "Instinct" and "Bloodline", Tess learns about Krypton and the name "Kal-El", though she does not attribute any of the information directly to Clark. In "Bulletproof", it is revealed that Tess knows where Lex is. Here, Lana informs Tess that Lex surgically implanted a nano-transmitter into Tess's optic nerve so that he could keep an eye on everything she is doing. Visibly upset by this, Tess places a jamming device into her necklace to disrupt the signal, but not before telling Lex that she will cut him off from the outside world and sell off everything that he owns. In the episode "Requiem", Tess sold controlling interest in LuthorCorp to Queen Industries. In "Turbulence", Tess tries to get Clark to reveal his powers after she read one of Lionel Luthor's journals that identified Clark as "The Traveler", but her effort failed. In the episode "Eternal", it is shown that Tess has the Kryptonian orb that brought down the Fortress of Solitude, and in "Injustice" a disembodied voice emanates from the orb revealing that Tess's recent actions to get Clark to reveal his powers and kill Doomsday are because the voice was instructing her to do so. In the season eight finale, the orb activates itself and transports Zod to Smallville.

After having her face burned in the season nine finale, Tess wakes up in the season ten premiere, with her face healed, in a secret lab surrounded by clones of Lex. In the tenth-season episode "Abandoned", it is revealed that Tess was born Lutessa Lena Luthor and is the illegitimate daughter of Lionel Luthor, conceived with Lex's nanny, Pamela Jenkins. She was brought, by Lionel, to an orphanage run by Granny Goodness when she was 5 years old. Shortly after Tess arrived at the orphanage, Lionel returned and removed Tess from Granny Goodness's guardianship. Granny Goodness wiped most of Tess's memories before Lionel put Tess up for adoption with the Mercer family. In the series finale, Tess is killed by the revived Lex Luthor after she administers a neurotoxin that removes all of the clone's memories in an effort to protect Clark's secret identity. In the season eleven comic, the neurotoxin caused a psychic link between the two, which caused her consciousness to leave her body and enter Lex's brain, when her body died. Eventually, Tess's friends discover this and have her consciousness uploaded into the computer system at the Watchtower. At the conclusion of season 11, Tess downloads herself into an android body and becomes Red Tornado.

=== Davis Bloome ===
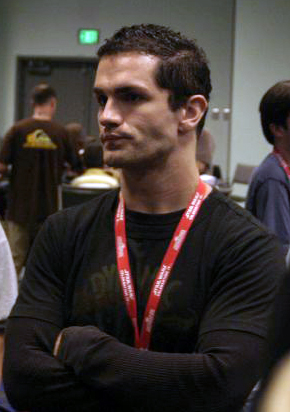
Sam Witwer portrays the role of Davis Bloome during season eight; Davis Bloome is the human alter-ego of the creature Doomsday.

Sam Witwer portrays Davis Bloome, a paramedic for Metropolis General Hospital. He first appears in the season eight episode "Plastique", assisting Chloe with helping an injured person after a bomb explosion. In the episode "Toxic", Chloe calls on his help when Oliver is poisoned and refuses to be taken to a hospital. In "Prey", Clark begins to suspect that Davis is a serial killer after he finds Davis unconscious at one of the murder scenes, and learns later that Davis is usually the first paramedic to arrive on similar scenes. Davis starts to suspect the same thing himself when he begins to lose track of large portions of time, and finds himself covered in blood, but with no wounds on his own body. Davis is informed by Faora, the wife of General Zod, that after the pair learned they could not have children that he was genetically created to adapt to any injury and to be Earth's ultimate destroyer. In "Abyss", Davis confesses to Chloe that he is in love with her, and believes that she is marrying the wrong man; as a result she asks him to not see her again. On Chloe's wedding day, in the episode "Bride", Davis transforms into the monster Doomsday, and travels to Smallville where he injures Jimmy and kidnaps Chloe. In the episode "Infamous", Davis discovers that he can keep Doomsday from emerging if he kills, and subsequently begins choosing criminals as his victims. He subsequently learns that Chloe's presence will also keep the monster at bay in the episode "Turbulence", and in "Beast" Davis and Chloe leave town together so that Davis can keep Doomsday from coming out. In the season eight finale, Chloe uses black kryptonite to separate Davis from Doomsday, leaving him human; when Davis discovers that Chloe does not love him he stabs Jimmy with a pipe. Before Davis can attack Chloe, Jimmy pushes him into a metal rod, which results in Davis's death before Jimmy himself dies.

Davis is actually Smallville's interpretation of the comic book character Doomsday, the only character to have succeeded at killing Superman. In Smallville, Doomsday is represented as a "nice guy" paramedic, who grew up moving from foster home to foster home. His storyline is considered "very dark" in that the character uncovers horrible truths about himself as season eight progresses. Brian Peterson explained that he, and the rest of the new executive producers, were looking for a villainous character that was "as great as Lex", with Michael Rosenbaum's departure at the end of the seventh season, and Doomsday fit what they were looking for. Although Witwer portrays Davis Bloome, who becomes the creature known as Doomsday, he does not actually wear the prosthetic body suit that was created for when Davis transforms into his monstrous counterpart. Instead, Doomsday is portrayed by stunt double Dario Delacio.

=== Oliver Queen ===
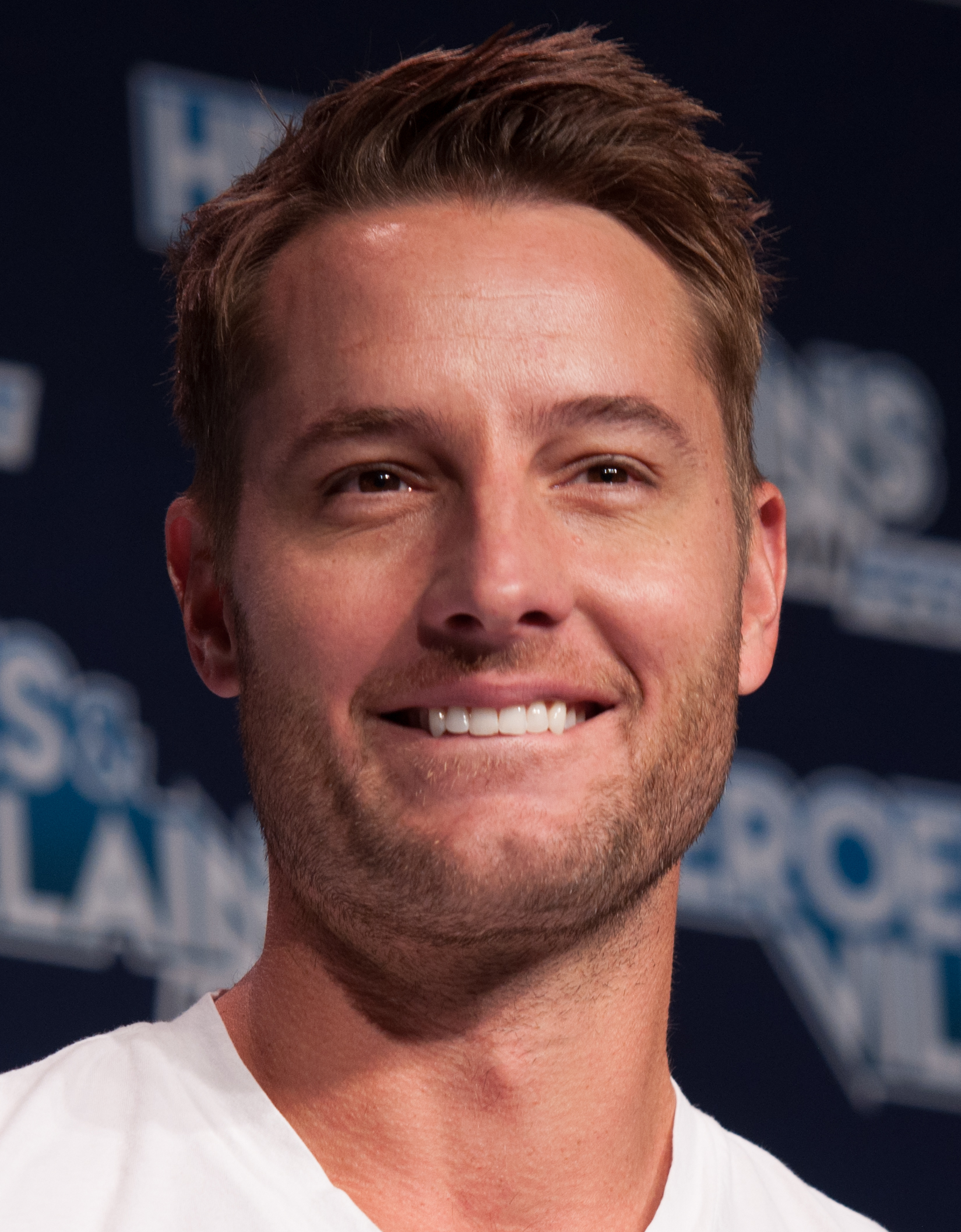
Justin Hartley portrayed Oliver Queen

Justin Hartley portrays Oliver Queen, a billionaire who left Star City to live in Metropolis. While in Metropolis, Oliver masquerades at night as a costumed vigilante, named "Green Arrow" by Lois. He later formed the Justice League. Oliver leaves Metropolis in season six, after destroying one of Lex's secret 33.1 facilities, where Lex experiments on meteor-infected individuals against their will, but he returns in season eight where he and the other Justice League members search for Clark, after the latter goes missing when his Fortress of Solitude is destroyed. Hartley was a recurring guest in the sixth and seventh seasons, but became a series regular in season eight.

=== Zod ===
Callum Blue portrays Zod in season nine. Zod is first mentioned in season five's "Arrival", when two of his disciples arrive on Earth attempting to turn the planet into Kryptonian utopia. In the episode "Solitude", Brainiac attempts to release him from the Phantom Zone where it is revealed that Clark's biological father Jor-El placed Zod's spirit after destroying his physical form. In the season five finale, Zod is successfully transferred into Lex Luthor's body, after Clark unknowingly releases him from the Phantom Zone. Clark eventually pulls Zod's spirit out of Lex's body using a Kryptonian crystal of his father's in the season six premiere. In the season eight finale, the Kryptonian purple orb, which was used in the season seven finale to destroy the Fortress of Solitude and remove Clark's powers, appears at the Luthor Mansion and releases Zod in physical form. In the season nine premiere, it is revealed that when Zod was released from the orb, he was also accompanied by hundreds of other Kryptonians, many of which were scattered across the globe. In addition, none of them were given the powers that typically accompany Kryptonians under the yellow Sun. Season nine episode "Kandor" reveals that the Kandorians are in fact clones created by Jor-El—at the orders of the Kryptonian Council—who also corrupted their DNA to prevent them from having powers and subsequently enslaving Earth. Eventually, Zod acquires his abilities when Clark saves Zod's life by healing a gunshot wound with his own blood in the episode "Conspiracy". Zod subsequently gives the rest of the Kandorians powers, using his blood to renew their lifeforce, and then wages a war on Earth in the season nine finale. Reluctant at first, Clark uses the Book of Rao to send all Kryptonians on Earth to another plane of existence where they can live in peace.

In an interview, executive producers Brian Peterson and Kelly Souders explained that this version of Zod is different from the one who appeared in prior seasons. The executives classified this incarnation as "Major Zod", as opposed to his typical "General Zod" identifier, and explained that throughout season nine "the venomous side of Zod rises because he experiences a few key betrayals with our beloved characters".

== Recurring characters ==
The following is a list of characters that are recurring on the series; they are listed in the order that they first appeared on the show. Seventeen characters have had storylines that have spanned multiple seasons, while the others are restricted to arcs that occurred during a single season of the show.

=== Sheriff Ethan ===
Sheriff Ethan is portrayed by Mitchell Kosterman in seventeen episodes spanning seasons one and two. Kosterman's first scene as Ethan came in "Jitters", which was originally scheduled to be the third episode of season one but was pushed back to eighth. Season one's "Rogue" introduced the idea Sheriff Ethan had a history with Jonathan, and it was that moment that Kosterman felt like he was more than a background image for the show. That history was used against Jonathan in season two's "Suspect", when Ethan framed him for the attempted murder of Lionel Luthor. Ethan's subterfuge was discovered by Clark and Pete, who set up a scheme of their own to bring Ethan's action to light, which resulted in Ethan's surrender and arrest.

Kosterman, who has played law enforcement officials before, initially turned down the role. After his agent informed him it would be a recurring role, and the producers were willing to pay him more than he made on any previous show, Kosterman decided to take the job. To executive producers Mark Verheiden and Greg Beeman, making Ethan the villain in "Suspect" was the ultimate "red herring" for audiences. Sheriff Ethan was originally going to take a nurse hostage, but the ending was rewritten to leave Ethan as more of a sympathetic character. Mitchell prefers the filmed ending, as he could not see any reason why his character would suddenly become evil. The actor believes his character fell into the established theme of "good people being pushed to do the wrong thing by bad people like Lionel Luthor".

=== Dr. Helen Bryce ===
Dr. Helen Bryce, portrayed by Emmanuelle Vaugier in nine episodes between seasons two and three, is a Smallville medical doctor who first appears in an anger management class Lex is sentenced to attend in the season two episode "Dichotic". She and Lex begin a romantic relationship which eventually turns into an engagement in season two's "Precipice". Her relationship with Lex concerns Jonathan when Helen—after taking a sample of blood from Clark during a period when he was infected by kryptonite—discovers Clark is not human in the episode "Fever". Helen promises Jonathan she will keep Clark's secret, but at the same time she does not destroy the vial of blood she took from Clark. As a result, the blood is stolen from her office in season two's "Calling", though it did not have Clark's name on it. Lex confesses he stole the vial of blood, which causes Helen to break up with him. Helen returns in the season two finale, where she forgives Lex and goes through with the marriage. Helen then drugs Lex on the way to their honeymoon, and leaves him to die in his LuthorCorp jet. When Lex returns in the season three episode "Phoenix", he orchestrates his own plan for revenge resulting in Helen's own disappearance while the two go on their second honeymoon.

By the time of season two's nineteenth episode, the writers had decided Helen's fate. Originally, the character was going to die on her wedding night, but the creative team felt they could use her more in the mythology. Gough explains that the idea about Helen still having Clark's blood, knowing his secret, and her relationship with Lex was too good to write off. The creative team kept Helen's true motivations a secret to Vaugier, which the actress enjoyed because it allowed her to play the character as if there were no ulterior motives.

=== Dr. Virgil Swann ===
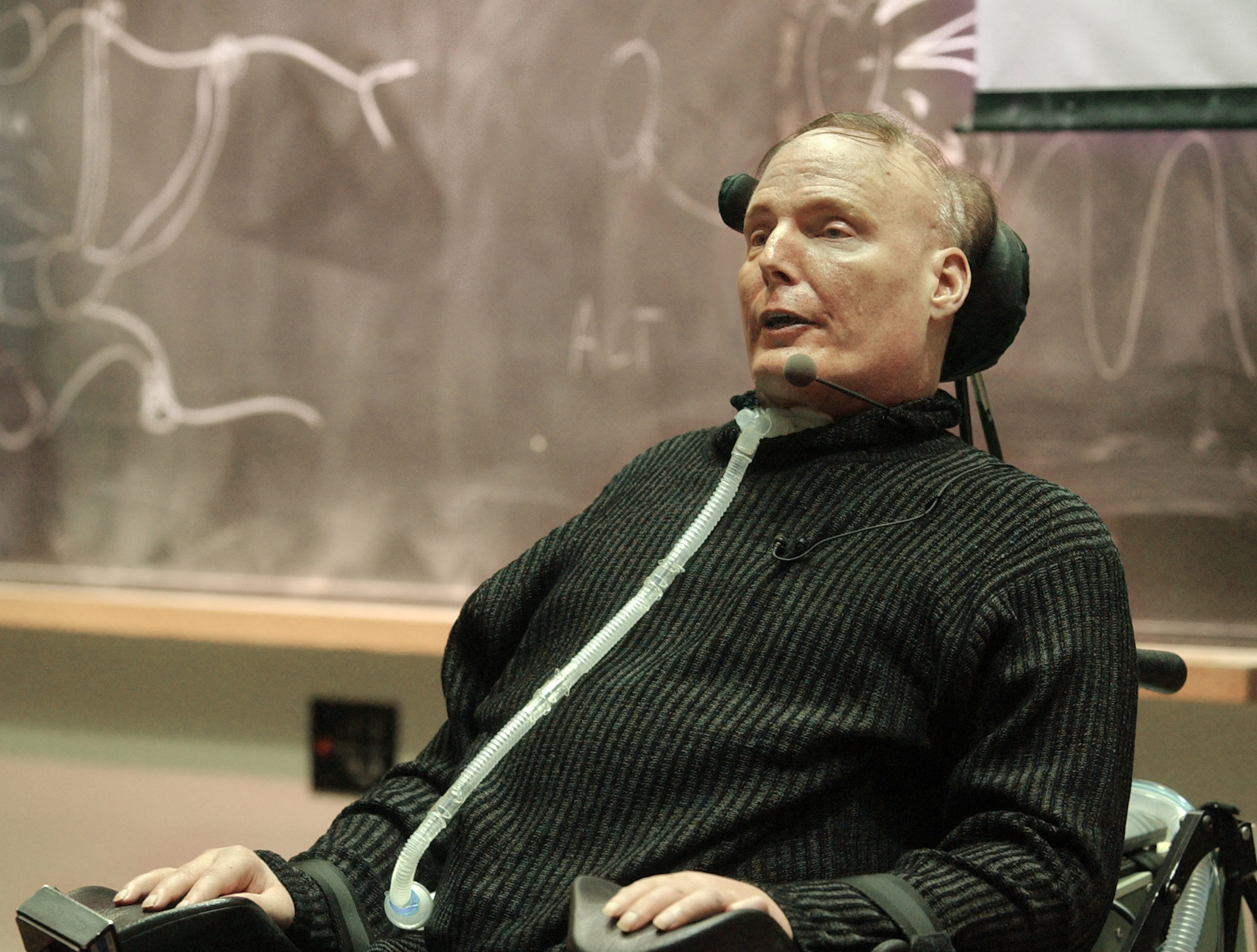
When filming his scenes, Reeve would give the director suggestions on ways to shoot without showing his wheelchair, so it would not be so obvious to audiences he was paralyzed.

Christopher Reeve appears twice as Virgil Swann, a scientist who was able to translate the Kryptonian language. Swann first meets Clark in the season two episode "Rosetta", where he explains his team of scientists intercepted a message from space and were able to translate it based on a mathematical key which accompanied the transmission. Swann informs Clark his birth name is Kal-El, and that he comes from a planet called Krypton, destroyed just after he was sent to Earth. When Lionel begins piecing together the alien language on the Kawatche cave walls, and Clark's constant presence at the caves, he seeks out Swann for the answers in the season three episode "Legacy". Swann, though he denies knowing how to read the symbols in the caves, agrees to help Lionel when he correctly guesses Lionel is dying; how Swann helps Lionel is not made clear. In season four's "Sacred", it is revealed that Swann died, but not before sending Clark the octagonal disk from Clark's ship, which had been missing since season three's "Legacy".

Gough and Millar always had intentions of bringing Christopher Reeve onto the show. When the pair learned Reeve enjoyed watching Smallville, Gough and Millar decided they were going to bring him on for season two. They had already crafted a character, Dr. Virgil Swann, who reveals the truth about Krypton to Clark, and they decided Reeve would be perfect for the part. According to Gough and Millar, it was "natural" for Reeve to be the one to educate Clark about his past, and help him see his future. As Gough describes it, the scene between Clark and Swann is a "passing of the torch" moment for the series. Gough and Millar explain the importance of the character: "Dr. Swann provided the first tantalizing answers to the quest plaguing Clark for all of his young life. 'Where am I from?' 'What happened to my parents?' 'Am I truly alone?" The creative team flew to New York to film Reeve's scenes since he used a wheelchair and required additional assistance when travelling. Although James Marshall directed the episode, for Reeve's scenes in New York the Smallville crew sent Greg Beeman as a stand-in director. Gough, Welling and Mat Beck travelled alongside Beeman to New York, where John Wells, who had previously lent his White House office on The West Wing to the Smallville crew for season one's "Hourglass", allowed the team to use the production offices from Third Watch for Reeve's scenes.

"I thought it would be fun; it's a very welcome relief from politics and medical research. Butting heads with politicians and the whole establishment in terms of advancing medical research is a very difficult job, and time-consuming and energy-consuming, and this is a very welcome change of pace".
— Reeve's experience filming

There was initial concern over Reeve's stamina, as his particular scene with Welling was six pages long, which translated to approximately twelve hours of work day. Beeman tried to design everything so it was as simple as possible, but Reeve quickly readjusted the scene. Beeman originally had Welling walk into frame and stand in front of Reeve, and then make a single move behind him. Beeman was told, by Reeve, the scene needed more dynamic between the characters, and if Welling only made a single move, the dynamic would be lost. According to Reeve, "Tom moving around me will hide the fact that I'm unable to move". Beeman's fear of overstretching Reeve's stamina were put to rest when Reeve himself stated it did not matter how long it took to finish the scene, as long as it turned out great. Reeve was directing Yankee Irving when Smallville was gearing up to film the fourth season opener. As a result, Reeve could not reprise his role as Swann, which was the intention.

=== Sheriff Nancy Adams ===
Camille Mitchell appears as Sheriff Nancy Adams in twenty-two episodes of Smallville, spanning the course of four seasons. Sheriff Adams makes her first appearance in the season two episode "Precipice", when she arrests Clark for getting into a fight with another patron of the Talon coffee shop. In the season five episode "Lockdown", Adams is killed by two rogue police officers looking for the black, alien ship which landed during the second meteor shower. Mitchell makes a guest appearance as Nancy Adams in season seven's "Apocalypse". In this episode, Clark is taken to an alternate reality where Adams, an agent for the Department of Domestic Security, is providing Lois with inside information on President Lex Luthor's operations.

Camille Mitchell had auditioned for the role of Byron's mother in season two's "Nocturne"; Greg Beeman had remembered the audition and had the actress come in to read for the role of Sheriff Adams. Mitchell did some research for the role, talking with female law enforcement officers to gain an understanding of how they evaluate situations. Mitchell views her character as a "down-to-earth sheriff" that carries with her a "farmer's common sense". The actress believes a character like Nancy Adams lends to the realism the show tries to portray within its comic book environment. Gough describes Sheriff Adams as "a cross between Holly Hunter and the sheriff in Fargo".

=== Jor-El ===
Terence Stamp voiced the disembodied spirit of Jor-El, Clark's biological father, in nineteen episodes from season two through season nine. Jor-El first appears to Clark as a voice emanating from the spaceship that brought Clark to Earth, informing him it is time to leave Smallville and fulfill his destiny. In season three's "Relic", it is revealed that Jor-El came to Smallville as a "rite of passage" by his own father. It is deduced by Clark that Jor-El chose the Kent family to be Clark's adoptive family after having a positive experience with Jonathan's father. In the season three finale, Jor-El tricks Clark into leaving Smallville. Jor-El returns Clark three months later, reprogrammed as "Kal-El" to seek out the three stones of knowledge so he can fulfill his destiny, but Clark regains his memories and stops looking for the three stones.

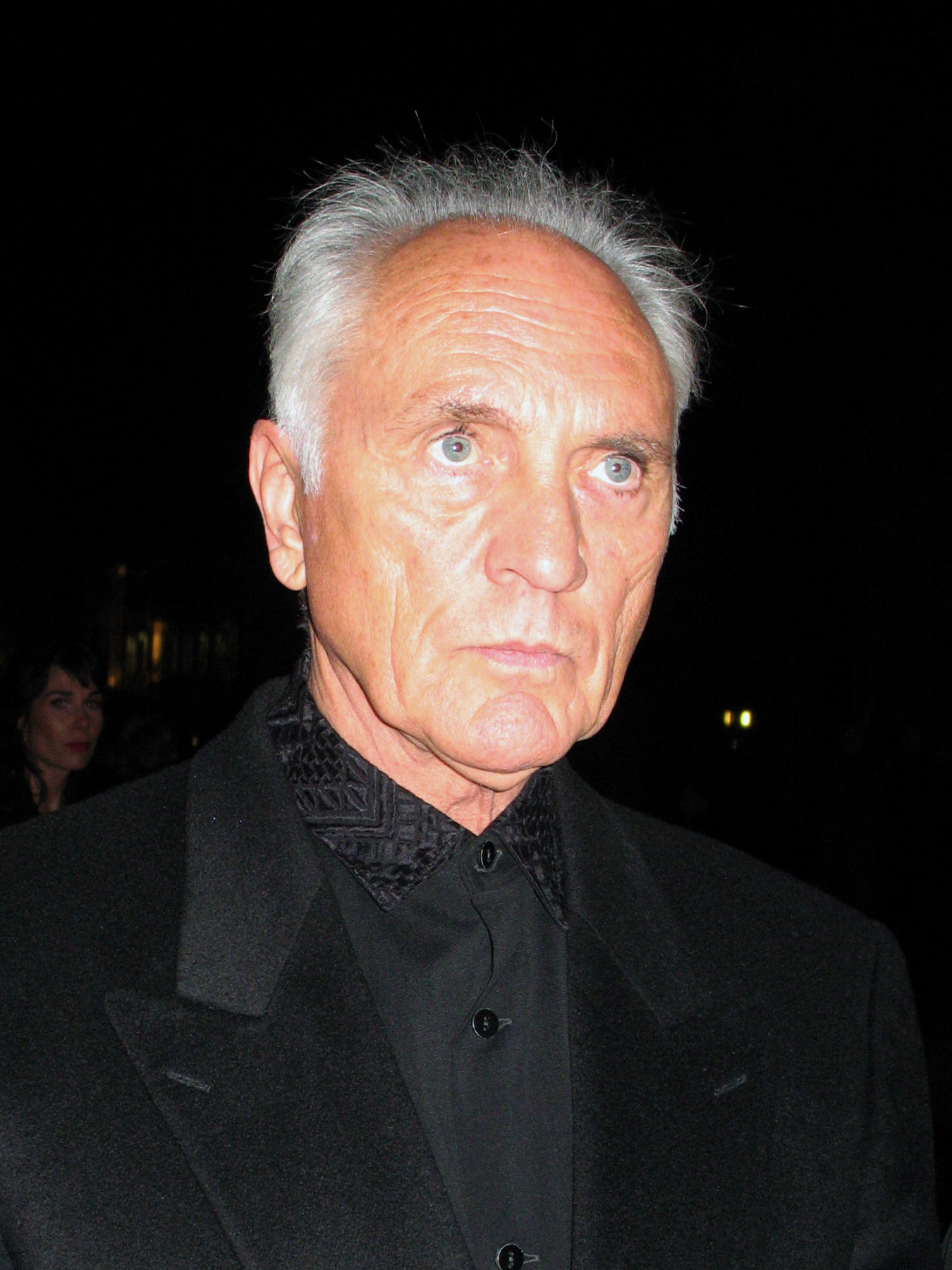
Terence Stamp, who voices the disembodied spirit of Clark's biological father Jor-El, also appeared as the villain General Zod in Superman and Superman II.

Eventually, Clark is forced to find all three stones, which results in the creation of the Fortress of Solitude in the season five premiere. There, Jor-El informs Clark he needs to begin his training in order to complete his destiny, but Clark interrupts the training to go back to Smallville, which forces Jor-El to strip Clark of his powers. When Clark is killed in his mortal body in season five's "Hidden", Jor-El resurrects Clark with his powers; as a result, Jonathan's life is traded for Clark's in the episode "Reckoning". Clark's consistent disobedience forces Jor-El to imprison his son in a block of ice in the season seven episode "Blue", but after learning a clone of Clark has returned to Smallville in "Persona", Jor-El frees his son so he can take care of the creature. When Clark thinks a world without him would be better, Jor-El sends Clark to an alternate reality to show him the world would be worse if he did not exist in it. By the start of season nine, Jor-El begins fully training Clark for his ultimate destiny. As part of that training, Jor-El informs Clark he needs to tune his Kryptonian intuition. To do so, Jor-El gives Clark the ability to read people's thoughts, only to take it away at an important moment and force Clark to apply what he has learned about human behavior. A clone of Jor-El is released on Earth in the episode "Kandor", but he is murdered before he can fully reunite with Clark and is only able to share a single moment with his son before dying.

Terence Stamp's name was deliberately kept out of the opening credits in order to keep the secret he was voicing Jor-El. Stamp originally portrayed General Zod in the first two Superman films, starring Christopher Reeve. Gough and Millar wanted to provide answers for certain aspects of the Superman mythology, so at the start of season three they tied Jonathan's heart condition to Jor-El, where Jonathan makes a deal with Jor-El to be given the power to bring Clark back. This power ultimately puts a strain on Jonathan's heart. The refusal by the film department to allow Smallville to cast a body as a physical representation of Jor-El forced the special effects crew to come up with a creative way to display some sort of aid to help the audience visualize this disembodied voice which was supposed to be talking to Jonathan in season three's "Exile". They decided to create a force field around whoever was speaking to Jor-El, which acted as Jor-El's voice, rippling as he spoke. To save money on this effect, the crew filmed John Schneider on a black backdrop, and Entity FX digitally added the force field around him. Wind machines and a spot light were added to help synthesize the atmosphere in the force field. At the time of season three's "Memoria", where a scene depicting Jor-El and Lara placing baby Kal-El into his ship before the destruction of Krypton was scripted, Warner Bros. was working on a new Superman film, and it was going to be an origin story, and as a result was still banning Smallville from showing Jor-El. Millar was forced to take inspiration from comic book scribe Jeph Loeb. In one of Loeb's book, Jor-El and Lara are depicted as just a pair of hands holding on to each other after they place Kal-El into his spaceship. In season nine, the producers were able to provide the character with a physical appearance, and Julian Sands was cast for the role.

=== Adam Knight ===
Adam Knight appears in six episodes of season three; he is portrayed by Ian Somerhalder. Adam is first seen as a fellow patient of Lana's at the Smallville Medical Center in the episode "Asylum"; he helps Lana get through her physical therapy after she was trampled by a horse. The two develop a friendship, which starts to grow deeper in the episode "Delete" when Lana offers to rent Adam the apartment above the coffee shop. In "Hereafter", Adam's actions—specifically his injection of an unidentified drug—begin to arouse suspicion in Lana and her friends. It is revealed Adam was once Chad Nash, a man who died of a rare liver disease, and the injection of a drug given to him by LuthorCorp resurrected him and is the only thing keeping him alive. Lana discovers Adam has been keeping a journal of all her actions, as well as all of Clark's, so she tries, and fails, to evict him. Lana asks Lex for help in getting rid of Adam, but he disappears before Lex can find him. In "Obsession", Lex tracks Adam's whereabouts to a LuthorCorp lab run by Dr. Teng, where Dr. Teng has been keeping Adam alive against the orders of Lionel Luthor, who cut off his supply when he failed to uncover any new information on Clark. Adam eventually breaks out of his confinement in the episode "Crisis", killing Dr. Teng and the rest of the lab technicians. He kidnaps Lana and attempts to kill her, but Clark arrives in time to stop him. Without his serum, Adam's body rapidly deteriorates until he finally dies.

When Adam Knight first appeared, there was internet speculation he was really Smallville's version of Bruce Wayne, based on the combination of the name of one of the actors to portray Bruce Wayne/Batman, Adam West, and one of Batman's nicknames, "Dark Knight". The crew stated it was never their intention to reveal Adam Knight to be a young version of Bruce Wayne. The actual intention was for Adam to be Lana's new boyfriend—a legitimate relationship—but the chemistry between Ian Somerhalder and Kristin Kreuk was not working. The creative team decided to bring the character's storyline out of the romantic path and into a "thriller Pacific Heights direction". Gough said that the character's storyline degenerated into a science fiction story, and when that occurred, they decided they had to wrap it up quickly.

=== Brainiac ===
James Marsters appears in eight episodes of season five, as well as four episodes of season seven, as the Kryptonian artificial intelligence known as Brainiac, referred to on the series as the "Brain InterActive Construct". Brainiac first appears in the season five episode "Arrival", and in the episode "Splinter" he assumes the identity of Central Kansas A&M professor Milton Fine, a fellow Kryptonian, in order to befriend Clark. His ultimate plan is revealed in the episode "Solitude" when he attempts to use Clark's Fortress of Solitude to release General Zod from the Phantom Zone; Clark stops Zod from being released. In the season five finale, Brainiac unleashes a computer virus that cripples the world's cyber infrastructure. He then transplants Zod's spirit into Lex when he tricks Clark into stabbing him with a Kryptonian dagger, providing Brainiac with a link to the Fortress so he can release Zod.

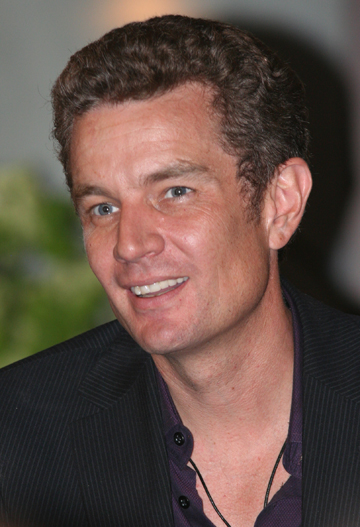
Marsters was Gough and Millar's first and only choice to play Brainiac; if Marsters had declined, they would have replaced Brainiac with another character from the DC Comics universe.

In season seven, Brainiac is revealed to be alive, and is slowly regaining strength by draining people of their natural metal content. Brainiac re-forms into Milton Fine in the season seven episode "Persona", and learns that his creator, Dax-Ur, is on Earth. Brainiac kills Dax-Ur, downloading the Kryptonian's knowledge so that he can completely repair himself. In season seven's "Apocalypse", Brainiac attempts to go back to Krypton just before it is destroyed and kill the infant Kal-El, but ultimately fails. In the season seven finale, Chloe discovers Brainiac has been impersonating Kara since she and Clark returned from Krypton. Brainiac attacks Chloe and puts her in a coma, but Clark destroys Brainiac before he can locate a device hidden on Earth which would allow him to control Clark. In season eight, Chloe is infected by Brainiac, who attempts to use her as a vessel while trying to take over Earth. In "Legion", he is subsequently exorcised from Chloe's body by the Legion of Super-Heroes, and taken back to the 31st century to be reprogrammed. The reprogrammed Brainiac returns in the season ten episode "Homecoming" to show Clark his past, present, and future and help him find confidence in becoming the hero the world needs.

Gough and Millar had always wanted Marsters for the role of Milton Fine/Brainiac. The pair wrote a draft for the major story arc of season five, knowing they wanted a new villain on the show to fight Clark. With the arrival of the black ship at the end of season four, Gough and Millar decided to introduce Brainiac. To them, Marsters was the only actor they could envision that could fit the "menace, intelligence, and sexiness" Brainiac was going to embody. Had Marsters declined the role, Gough and Millar would have rethought introducing Brainiac, as they could not think of any other actor who could fill those shoes. Marsters felt excited playing a character that was completely intentional; he likened the intention to that of a shark. As Marsters explains, "[Fine] was just composed of his intent. And that's exciting—it's like watching a shark. You don't really ask how a shark is feeling—it's pure".

Writer Steven DeKnight, who wrote for Marsters when he was portraying Spike on Buffy the Vampire Slayer, used a different approach for Marsters when writing for him as Brainiac. Spike is more "snarky", and DeKnight felt Fine is more sincere, and a "straight-ahead classic villain". This different approach to villainy worked well for Marsters, who wanted to show people he could portray characters who were not just another "Spike". Marsters describes Brainiac as "a murderous robot" with no remorse over his actions. According to Marsters, the character is an "intellectual" who is focused on what he wants. The actor was drawn to the series because of the "refreshing" take the producers had, as well as an appreciation for the idea of a show about Clark's journey toward becoming Superman.

Though the actor enjoyed playing the part of Brainiac, Marsters did have an initial apprehension about taking the role. As he is familiar with Brainiac from the comics, Marsters did not wish to be turned green and wear the character's traditional pink outfit. The actor had to do little research on his character, as Brainiac's original back story only consisted of a few comic book panels. Marsters believes his character wants to get rid of the humans because they are doing nothing but destroying their own planet, and Brainiac sees it as his duty to perform "pest control" on the species. The actor was going to appear in season six, but because his schedule filled, the producers wanted to "close the door" on this storyline, so they "killed" his character. Later, Marsters was approached by Gough and Millar about returning to the show for its seventh season; this time Marsters had free time in his schedule, and was able to return for four episodes.

=== Grant Gabriel ===
Michael Cassidy appears in seven episodes of season seven as the Daily Planet's newest editor, Grant Gabriel, and the love interest for Lois this season. Shortly after hiring Lois, which he did in part to inspire better stories out of Chloe, Grant begins a romantic relationship with Lois in the episode "Wrath". The couple's secret is discovered by Chloe and Lex in "Blue", who both insist Lois and Grant break up to prevent questions about how Lois actually got her job. The two stay together, working harder to keep their relationship a secret. After Lex buys the Daily Planet in season seven's "Gemini", it is revealed Grant is actually a clone of Lex's baby brother Julian, who died as an infant. When Grant discovers this information, he attempts to connect with Lionel in the episode "Persona", to keep Lex from controlling his life. When Lex cannot control Grant, he has him murdered, staging it as a failed mugging.

== Other characters ==
The following is a supplementary list of recurring guest stars, which includes characters that appear briefly in multiple episodes, like a regularly appearing doctor, but have little to no real world content to justify an entire section covering their in-universe histories. The characters are listed in the order in which they first appeared on Smallville.

=== Season 1 ===
- Sarah-Jane Redmond as Nell Potter
- Jason Connery as Dominic Santori
- Tom O'Brien as Roger Nixon
- Hiro Kanagawa as Principal Kwan
- Robert Wisden as Gabe Sullivan
- Joe Morton as Dr. Steven Hamilton
- Kelly Brook as Victoria Hardwick
- Rekha Sharma as Dr. Harden
- Julian Christopher as Dr. MacIntyre

=== Season 2 ===
- Jerry Wasserman as Dr. Yaeger Scanlan
- Patrick Cassidy as Henry Small
- Martin Cummins as Dr. Garner
- Jill Teed as Maggie Sawyer
- Rob LaBelle as Dr. Walden

=== Season 3 ===
- Françoise Yip as Dr. Teng
- Lorena Gale as Dr. Claire Foster
- Sarah Carter as Alicia Baker
- Alisen Down as Lillian Luthor
- Gary Hudson as Frank Loder

=== Season 4 ===
- Kyle Gallner as Bart Allen/Impulse:
- Jane Seymour as Genevieve Teague

=== Season 5 ===
- Alan Ritchson as Arthur Curry/Aquaman
- Lee Thompson Young as Victor Stone/Cyborg

=== Season 6 ===
- Fred Henderson as Dr. Langston
- Ben Ayres as Bartlett
- Phil Morris as John Jones

=== Season 7 ===
- Kim Coates as Federal Agent Carter
- Don Broatch as Shaw Madson
- Alaina Huffman as Dinah Lance/Black Canary

=== Season 8 ===
- Anna Williams as Eva
- Alessandro Juliani as Dr. Emil Hamilton
- Serinda Swan as Zatanna Zatara

=== Season 9 ===
- Adrian Holmes as Basqat
- Sharon Taylor as Faora
- Monique Ganderton as Alia
- Ryan McDonell as Stuart Campbell
- Pam Grier as Agent Amanda Waller
- Crystal Lowe as Vala
- Michael Shanks as Carter Hall/Hawkman
- Britt Irvin as Courtney Whitmore/Stargirl

=== Season 10 ===
- Ted Whittall as Rick Flag
- Keri Lynn Pratt as Cat Grant
