= Professor Hamilton =

Fictional DC comics character, created 1987

Emil Hamilton
- Emil Hamilton as depicted in The Adventures of Superman #425 (February 1987). Art by Jerry Ordway (penciler/inker) and Tom Ziuko (colorist).

Publication information
- Publisher: DC Comics
- First appearance: As Professor Hamilton: The Adventures of Superman #424 (January 1987); As Ruin: Adventures of Superman #630 (September 2004)
- Created by: Marv Wolfman (writer); Jerry Ordway (artist)

In-story information
- Alter ego: Emil Hamilton
- Species: Human
- Team affiliations: S.T.A.R. Labs; Enginehead; Society
- Notable aliases: Ruin
- Abilities: Genius-level intelligence Expert scientist

Professor Emil Hamilton is a character appearing in American comic books published by DC Comics, usually as a supporting character in stories featuring Superman.

The character was portrayed by Richard Schiff in Man of Steel. Additionally, Victor Brandt and Robert Foxworth voice Hamilton in the DC Animated Universe (DCAU) series Superman: The Animated Series and Justice League Unlimited.

== Publication history ==
Created by writer Marv Wolfman and artist Jerry Ordway, Professor Emil Hamilton first appeared in The Adventures of Superman #424 (January 1987). His depictions in various incarnations range from that of a trusted ally to Superman and his colleagues to one who is cautious and mistrustful of Superman and his power, to an unambiguous villain. The character was named after Edmond Hamilton, who wrote stories about Superman and other characters from the 1940s to the 1960s.

== Fictional character biography ==
Emil Hamilton is introduced as a villain, using his gadgets to attack Superman in an attempt to gain funding by proving that they work. A former employee of S.T.A.R. Labs, Hamilton was driven insane when Lex Luthor bought his research and took credit for his inventions. After being treated and released, Hamilton sets up a laboratory in Metropolis and becomes Superman's "scientific advisor" and technical consultant. He creates many devices to aid Superman, including the Phantom Zone projector and early versions of the Superman robots.

During "The Death of Superman" storyline, Hamilton attempts to assist Superman in battling the alien monster Doomsday. When Doomsday mortally wounds Superman, Hamilton attempts to save his life, but is unsuccessful and Superman is declared dead. Hamilton loses an arm during the "Fall of Metropolis" storyline, but replaces it with a self-designed cybernetic prosthesis.

Following Superman's resurrection, Hamilton assists him in restoring the Fortress of Solitude and saving the citizens of the bottled city of Kandor. Hamilton also provides Superboy with a visor that replicates the X-ray and heat vision he lacks.

Many years later, when John Henry Irons returns to Metropolis, Hamilton feels that he is being sidelined, as Superman now has access to a scientific genius who is also a fellow superhero. He disappears during the arrival of Brainiac 13, only to resurface as the Overmind, the leader of a gang plotting Brainiac's return. Hamilton is partially controlled by Brainiac's technology infecting his arm.

In a 2005 storyline, Hamilton becomes the villain Ruin, seeking to prevent Superman from destroying Earth's sun. Ruin claims that Superman is draining the Sun's energy, accelerating the death of the Sun by 500 million years. Hamilton frames Superman's friend Pete Ross, making him appear to be Ruin. Hamilton confronts Superman and reveals his identity as Ruin to him, only to be imprisoned after Superman clears Ross' name.

Following "The New 52" reboot and the "DC Rebirth" relaunch, Hamilton is reintroduced in the Titans: Beast World storyline. He assists Bibbo Bibbowski in curing Jimmy Olsen of Beast Boy's spores which transformed him into a mutant turtle.

== Powers and abilities ==
Emil Hamilton is a normal human being and thus, has no inherent powers, though he is a brilliant scientist and inventor, having designed and built devices such as a force-field generator. As Ruin, he wields a powered suit that enables him to teleport and generate red sunlight.

=== Equipment ===
Hamilton has designed various prosthetic arms with unusual abilities, including one that acted as a sunscreen dispenser.

== Other versions ==
- An alternate universe version of Professor Hamilton appears in JLA: The Nail #2.
- An alternate universe version of Professor Hamilton appears in Elseworld's Finest: Supergirl & Batgirl #1. This version previously worked with Lex Luthor to create a new solar battery, only to have his reputation ruined when Hamilton attempted to reveal the battery uses the corpse of an infant Kal-El as its power source.
- The pre-Flashpoint version of Hamilton appears in Convergence, where he reforms, moves to Gotham City, and repairs his friendship with Jimmy Olsen. Furthermore, he builds the Whiz Wagon, a flying, multi-purpose vehicle, as self-imposed reformation therapy.

== In other media ==
=== Television ===
Emil Hamilton as depicted in Smallville

- Emil Hamilton appears in Lois & Clark: The New Adventures of Superman, portrayed by John Pleshette.
- Emil Hamilton appears in series set in the DC Animated Universe (DCAU):
  - Hamilton is introduced in Superman: The Animated Series, voiced by Victor Brandt. Throughout the series, he assists Superman by creating numerous inventions, such as Kryptonite-resistant suits and a Phantom Zone projector, until Superman is brainwashed by Darkseid in the series finale, causing Hamilton to distrust him and other metahumans.
  - Hamilton appears in Justice League Unlimited, voiced by Robert Foxworth. By this time, he has secretly joined Project Cadmus, using his expertise in genetics to create the Ultimen and Galatea.
- Two characters named Hamilton appear in Smallville:
  - Steven Hamilton appears in the first and second seasons, portrayed by Joe Morton. An expert in mineralogy and meteors, he is hired by Lex Luthor to study the effects of kryptonite, only to later die from overexposure to it.
  - Emil Hamilton appears in the eighth season onward, portrayed by Alessandro Juliani. This version is a private doctor, leader of S.T.A.R. Labs, and ally of the Justice League, having been hired by Oliver Queen.
- A female character based on Emil Hamilton named Amelia Hamilton appears in Supergirl, portrayed by Sarah Robson. She is a member of the Department of Extranormal Operations (DEO).

=== Film ===
- Emil Hamilton appears in Man of Steel, portrayed by Richard Schiff. This version is a DARPA scientific adviser for the U.S. military under General Swanwick. He later sacrifices himself to help destroy General Zod's World Engine before it destroys humanity.
- An alternate universe version of Emil Hamilton appears in Justice League: Gods and Monsters, voiced by Trevor Devall. This version is a member of LexCorp's "Project Fair Play", a weapons contingency program meant to destroy the Justice League if necessary, who is later killed by the Metal Men.

=== Video games ===
- Professor Hamilton appears in Superman 64, voiced again by Victor Brandt.
- Professor Hamilton appears in Superman: Shadow of Apokolips, voiced again by Victor Brandt.
- Professor Hamilton appears in Superman Returns.
- Professor Hamilton appears as a character summon in Scribblenauts Unmasked: A DC Comics Adventure.

=== Miscellaneous ===
The Smallville incarnation of Emil Hamilton appears in Smallville Season 11. He helps the Watchtower Network construct an outpost on the moon, assists in transferring Tess Mercer's consciousness from her half-brother Lex Luthor's body to the Watchtower's computer system, and acts as her psychiatrist. After Mercer downloads herself into the "Red Tornado" android and joins the Justice League, she and Hamilton begin dating.
