= Justice League (Smallville) =

Fictional group of superheroes on the television series, Smallville

- Smallville organization
- From left to right: Bart Allen, Oliver Queen, Clark Kent, Arthur Curry, and Victor Stone in their first team appearance in the season six episode "Justice".
- First appearance: "Justice"; January 18, 2007
- Based on: Justice League by Gardner Fox
- Adapted by: Alfred Gough; Miles Millar

In-universe information
- Type: Superhero
- Founder: Oliver Queen / Green Arrow
- Key people: Bart Allen / Impulse; Arthur Curry / Aquaman; Victor Stone / Cyborg; Clark Kent / Superman; Dinah Lance / Black Canary; Chloe Sullivan; J'onn J'onzz / Martian Manhunter; Carter Hall / Hawkman; Courtney Whitmore / Stargirl; Tess Mercer; Kara Zor-El / Supergirl; Michael Jon Carter / Booster Gold; Diana Prince / Wonder Woman; Bruce Wayne / Batman; John Stewart / Green Lantern

The Justice League is a group of superheroes on the television series Smallville, who were adapted for television by Alfred Gough and Miles Millar. The Justice League originally included Oliver Queen, Bart Allen, Victor Stone, and Arthur Curry; Clark Kent did not accept a role until three seasons later. As the team continued to appear in the series, new characters were introduced and subsequently joined the team. The original Justice League first appeared in the DC comic book The Brave and the Bold #28 (1960), and consisted of members Superman, Batman, Wonder Woman, Flash, Green Lantern, Aquaman, and the Martian Manhunter. In Smallville, the team did not make its first official appearance until the season six episode "Justice", although each member had been previously introduced individually on various episodes since season four. In the series, the team never formalized a name for themselves, although the cast and crew officially recognized the team as the "Justice League".

Series' writers wanted to make sure the characters had similar characteristics to their comic book counterparts, but at the same time, could become a means for Clark to learn about himself. The creative team attempted to stay true to the spirit of the comic in costume design for certain characters, while costumes for other characters were changed dramatically. All of the characters possess superpowers, with the exception of Oliver, so Entity FX was brought in to digitally create each character's powers using 3D and 2D technologies.

In addition to the live-action television series, the Justice League has also been featured in a promotional tie-in with Toyota, through an interactive, online comic book. On an individual level, Oliver received his own tie-in that provided Sprint users with animated episodes depicting Oliver's backstory on their mobile phones. Overall, the reception for the characters has been mixed. Critics have viewed Alan Ritchson's (Arthur) acting ability and the shortened introductory storylines for the team negatively, while the characters of Oliver and Black Canary were viewed more positively.

== Roles in Smallville ==
=== Individual storylines ===
Although the Justice League first appeared in season six's "Justice", each member had their own introduction and recurring storylines in the series prior to the formation of the team. The first member to appear on Smallville, other than Clark Kent (Tom Welling), was Bart Allen (Kyle Gallner), who was introduced in the season four episode "Run". In the episode, Bart is the first person Clark discovers to have a superhuman ability—being able to run at supersonic speeds—that was not created from exposure to kryptonite. When Clark and Bart first meet, Bart is a pickpocket who saves Jonathan Kent (John Schneider) from being hit by a truck. Eventually, Clark convinces Bart to give up his life of crime. Arthur Curry (Alan Ritchson), who has the ability to swim at superhuman speeds and create energy blasts through the water, is next to appear in the season five episode "Aqua". Arthur arrives in Smallville to stop an underwater weapon developed by Lex Luthor (Michael Rosenbaum), which is killing the surrounding ocean life. Arthur and Clark initially clash on Arthur's tactics; Arthur tries to blow up Lex's lab, while Clark insists that they should simply talk to Lex face-to-face and ask him to stop. Eventually, Arthur and Clark locate and destroy the weapon outright. Season five also introduced Victor Stone (Lee Thompson Young) in the episode "Cyborg". Here, it is revealed that Victor was mortally wounded in a car accident that also took the lives of his family, but Lex's company, LuthorCorp, took Victor's body to a research lab where they experimented on him, ultimately replacing his bone skeleton with a metal one. Clark attempts to provide Victor with a safe haven after Victor escapes from Lex's facility. Clark manages to convince Lex to stop hunting Victor, who eventually leaves Smallville with his girlfriend.

Oliver Queen (Justin Hartley), a billionaire who left Star City to live in Metropolis, arrives in the season six episode "Sneeze" to investigate Lex Luthor. In the episode "Arrow", Oliver begins masquerading around Metropolis as a costumed vigilante, named "Green Arrow" by Lois Lane (Erica Durance), who robs from the rich—only taking objects he knows were already stolen by those wealthy individuals—and gives to the poor. Oliver also begins a romantic relationship with Lois. Eventually, Oliver's vigilante life takes priority, and he and Lois break up when Oliver is forced to leave town to investigate more of Lex's machinations. In season eight's premiere, Oliver moves back to Metropolis, and begins searching for Lex, who has been missing since the season seven finale. Oliver believes he has tracked Lex's whereabouts in the episode "Bride", but he does not find Lex when he arrives; instead, Oliver reveals that he plans to kill Lex when he does find him because of the threat he perceives Lex poses to both Clark and the rest of the world. In the episode "Requiem", Oliver takes controlling interest in LuthorCorp after Tess Mercer (Cassidy Freeman), Lex's handpicked successor for LuthorCorp, sells him the company. As a result, Lex attempts to kill him. Oliver tracks Lex down and blows-up the medical caravan that Lex was supposedly traveling in.

John Jones (Phil Morris) is also introduced in season six, where he appears in "Labyrinth", guiding Clark out of a fictitious reality that was created by Dr. Hudson, a Phantom Zone criminal attempting to take over Clark's body. It is revealed in the season's finale that he has been working with Lionel Luthor (John Glover), and was once an emissary of Clark's biological father, Jor-El. John explains that he has been watching over Clark since his arrival on Earth, instructed by Jor-El only to interfere if Clark's life was in true danger. In the season seven premiere, John lends assistance to Clark in defeating the last of the Phantom Zone criminals, which turned itself into Clark's doppelganger. In the season eight premiere, John sacrifices his own abilities to save Clark's life. In season eight's "Prey", John informs Clark that he has taken a job as a Metropolis police detective so that he can be around if Clark needs assistance. In season nine's "Absolute Justice", John has his Martian powers restored by Dr. Fate (Brent Stait) and then helps Clark and other members of the Justice Society of America defeat a mutual enemy.

=== Justice League storylines ===
The Justice League made its first official team appearance in the season six episode "Justice". Here, Clark discovers that Oliver has also met Bart, Arthur, and Victor, and that he has organized them into a team of superheroes focused on stopping those who believe that they are above the law. Oliver reveals that Lex has been conducting experiments on people who developed special abilities thanks to exposure to kryptonite. Clark and Chloe Sullivan (Allison Mack) work alongside the team to dismantle Lex's local experimental facility, known as Level 33.1, and after destroying the building, Oliver and his team leave Smallville to seek out Lex's other facilities around the world. Oliver asks Clark to become a full-fledged member of the team, but Clark turns Oliver down explaining that he is not ready to do that. In the season seven episode "Siren", Lex puts a bounty on Oliver and his team, convincing the vigilante Dinah Lance (Alaina Huffman), who goes by the name "Black Canary" and has the ability to emit an ultrasonic sound wave with a single scream, that these individuals are terrorists. In the end, Clark proves to Dinah that Lex lied to her, so she decides to join Oliver's team. In the season eight premiere, the Justice League set out to find Clark, who has disappeared following the destruction of his Fortress of Solitude in the previous season's finale. Clark is eventually found, but the true identities of the League's members are compromised, so the team decides to disband until it is safe again for them to work together. In the season eight episode "Hex", Oliver reforms his team and gives Chloe the role of "Watchtower". In that season's finale, it is revealed that the League has been tracking the genetically engineered Kryptonian known as Doomsday. Oliver tries to convince Clark to kill the creature, but Clark refuses and instead informs Dinah and Bart that Oliver murdered Lex, while simultaneously kicking Oliver off of the team. Using subterfuge, Dinah and Bart betray Clark, revealing that they were in agreement with Oliver's plan all along, and capture Doomsday to force Clark into a fight. Their plan backfires, and Doomsday injures all of them during his escape. In the end, Clark defeats the creature by burying him a mile underground, and Oliver and his team apologize for not following Clark's plan from the start. The League leaves Metropolis afterward, feeling responsible for the death of Jimmy Olsen (Aaron Ashmore), who was killed after Doomsday escaped. In response, Chloe turns a Metropolis clock tower, which is also the tallest building in the city, into the Watchtower base with the hope that the team will one day return home. The team eventually reforms off screen, and assists Clark in hunting down other Kryptonians who are attempting to take over the Earth. Starting with the ninth episode of the final season, "Patriot", the Justice League are alerted to the arrival of Darkseid, and for the rest of the season they attempt to stop him before he destroys Earth. Subsequent episodes "Dominion" and "Prophecy" also imply that Michael Carter (Booster Gold) and Kara have joined the team.

== Portrayals ==
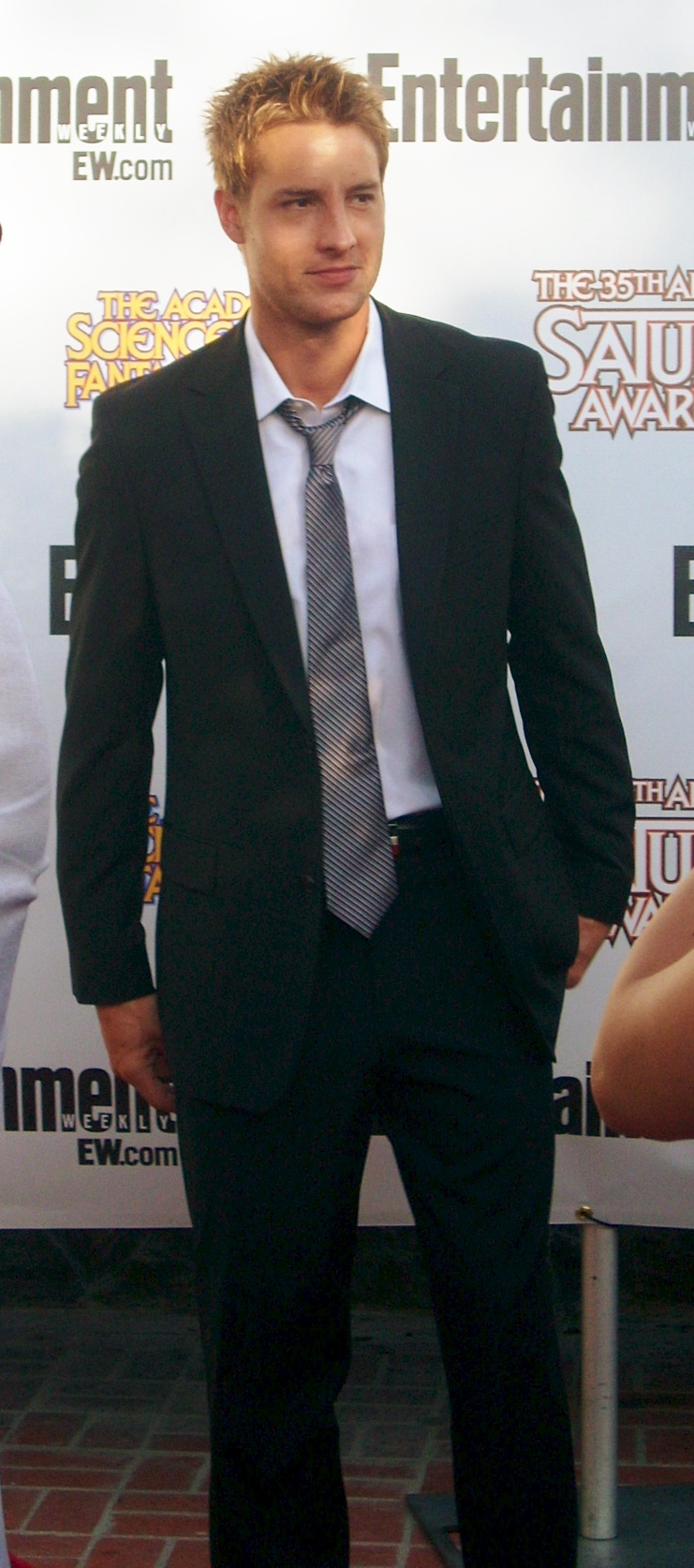
Justin Hartley was the producers' first choice to portray Oliver Queen on Smallville, after having him cast as the titular character in the Aquaman pilot that was never picked up for broadcast.

The producers wanted to use either Wally West or Barry Allen as the Flash alter ego for the show, but DC Comics would only approve the use of Bart Allen. In DC Comics, Bart typically goes by the codename of "Impulse", but did have a short series in 2006 where he took over the role of Flash. Kyle Gallner learned through his agent about a superhero role being called for on Smallville, and when he learned that it was going to be Impulse, he convinced himself that he was going to win the role. Gallner went in for two auditions, but was so disappointed with his performance during the second audition that he believed he had failed to get the role. His fear was unfounded when the producers offered him the part.

After being cast as Arthur Curry, a character who had previously never been officially portrayed in any live-action form, Alan Ritchson did some research on his character when he discovered that Aquaman had a "serious...fan base". Ritchson wanted to live up to the expectations he felt fans of the character would have. Like Gallner, Ritchson did not expect to be a part of the show again. After season five, there was an attempt to launch an Aquaman television series, which ultimately was never picked up. Ritchson relished the opportunity to return when he was called in to appear in the episode that would feature the first official appearance of the Justice League.

Until season five's "Cyborg", the DC Comics superheroes who had paid Clark a visit on the show were all members of the Justice League of America, but Gough and Miller felt that Victor Stone shared a "relatable dilemma" with Clark—the fact that both Victor and Clark's abilities get in the way of their romantic relationships with the women they love—and was someone the developers felt was just an interesting character. Victor normally goes by the alias "Cyborg" and is a member of the Teen Titans in the comics. Casting Lee Thompson Young was something the producers had always wanted to do, even before they had decided to bring in Cyborg. The actor revealed that his first contact with the Cyborg character came not from the comics, but from the Teen Titans animated television series. Young said that he was fortunate that this version of Victor Stone was Smallville's spin on the character, and as such, the majority of the character's background was in the script. While preparing, Young expressed his pleasure in the fact that the producers decided to keep Victor's robotic parts internal, as opposed to the comic version, where half of Cyborg's visible body is covered in metal.

According to Gough, Justin Hartley was the producers' first choice to play the role of Oliver Queen, and his alter ego Green Arrow. Oliver was designed to provide an alternative view for what it means to be a hero. At the same time, the producers wanted a character that could impact the lives of both Clark and Lois. The actor is also the first to portray Oliver Queen/Green Arrow in any live-action media. Hartley believed that it was the season six episode "Reunion" that really helped him to understand his character. In the episode, it is revealed that Oliver was "a jerk to Lex" when the two were at school together, and after another kid falls into a coma because of Oliver and Lex's actions, Oliver decides to start a new path for himself. Hartley said that this allowed the actor to "justify why someone would put their life in danger every night and have such strong feelings about going out and being this social advocate". Hartley was a recurring guest in the sixth and seventh seasons, but became a series regular in season eight.

Alaina Huffman auditioned for Smallville without being aware of which role was being cast, and was offered the part of Dinah Lance/Black Canary. When the producers informed her of how major this character is to the DC mythology, Huffman used various comic books and online sources to learn more about her character. Approached by the producers, Phil Morris auditioned twice for the role of John Jones/Martian Manhunter, and then waited three weeks before receiving confirmation of the role. Morris relished the new design of the character, stepping away from the cape and tights, and going with a more contemporary look. He classified John Jones as Jor-El's "tool, security force, his guardian, and his protector". The actor has stated that he would like his character to lead the future Justice League on the show, as he sees John Jones as a natural leader.

== Character development ==
=== Characteristics ===
When Steven S. DeKnight was writing the episode "Run" for the first official appearance of Bart Allen, he knew he had to give the character certain characteristics that embodied his comic book counterpart. DeKnight knew Bart had to be faster than Clark, because in the comic, that is one advantage Flash has over Superman. DeKnight also featured Bart as a "smart-ass", after being inspired by the sarcastic Flash that appears in the animated television series, Justice League. DeKnight's belief is that Bart enjoys his powers, and would not exhibit the more "somber or serious" characteristics of other character. As Gallner pointed out, Bart accepts who he is, and what he can do, and he even abuses his gifts somewhat. The difference between him and Clark is that Bart is not afraid to show the world what he can do. Gallner also suggested that in his character's initial appearance, Bart is living in a "confused" state, because he has developed these extraordinary powers, his parents do not accept him, and he ends up turning to thievery just to take care of himself.

"He accepts [his powers]. He uses them. He may even abuse them a little bit. But he's not ashamed of who he is. He's not scared of being who he is, and he kind of lets the world know that he's there".
— Kyle Gallner on Bart's personality

Ritchson described Arthur Curry as someone who will "do anything to save what he loves". The actor goes on to say that Arthur is "passionate about nature, about the earth, and about the seas", and is not afraid to use his abilities to save those things that are dear to him. When comparing his character to Clark, Ritchson stated that Arthur is more confident in his abilities, and already knows what he can do and what his path is in life. Another big difference the actor pointed out is that unlike Clark, Arthur is willing to sacrifice people and things if it means preserving the greater good. When he first appears, one of Victor Stone's key characteristics is that both he and Clark can relate to the fact that they feel their abilities inhibit them from having a true relationship with the women they love. The writers tried to create parallels between the characters to emphasize this more, like Victor's fear of telling his girlfriend the truth about what LuthorCorp did to his body, and Clark's fear of Lana Lang discovering he is an alien. Writer Tracy Bellomo characterized Oliver as a guy that does not take himself very seriously, and enjoys making fun of people that try to take him that way. Bellomo believed that this is one of the reasons that Oliver is attracted to Lois, with the other being that Lois provides a challenge for him. Oliver's relationship with Clark is designed to "broaden Clark's rather limited horizons", and to teach Clark that a world exists beyond Smallville.

=== Costumes ===
When coming up with costumes for Smallville's Justice League, designer Caroline Cranstoun researched various comic book designs before crafting her own. With Black Canary, Cranstoun chose a design that held a Lara Croft/Tank Girl feel.

In the episode "Wither", Oliver and Lois attend a costumed ball, where Oliver dresses up as Robin Hood. The designers decided to model Oliver's costume after the comic book character Green Arrow. Costume designer Caroline Cranstoun designed Oliver's official Green Arrow costume in conjunction with illustrator Andy Poon. To hide his face, Green Arrow typically wears a mask over his eyes, but Cranstoun and Keith Christensen, of Ocean Drive Leather, opted to use a hood and a pair of dark sunglasses to hide Oliver's face. Cranstoun revealed that Miles Millar was the one who came up with the hood idea. The costume is also made entirely out of leather, as the creative team wanted to keep away from using tights. Hartley was very impressed with the costume, but confessed that it was uncomfortable to wear because it had layers of leather, and he had to wear boots with four-inch lifts.

After creating Oliver's Green Arrow costume, Cranstoun had the task of crafting updated costume looks for Bart, Arthur, and Victor for the "Justice" episode. Cranstoun explained that even though Victor does not have any metal on his physical body like his comic book counterpart, she wanted to include a metallic look to his costume. The designer tried to give Victor a more "futuristic" feel, along with "a bit of Transformer-y" essence, by including angular pieces on his vest and coloring them silver, black, and purple. For Bart, the costume designers tried to take what was used in his season four appearance and move that to the next level. In season four, Bart wore a red hoodie with yellow cargo pants, which were used to reflect his teenage identity. With his Justice League appearance, they tried to give the character an appearance that seemed faster. His yellow cargo pants were replaced with red jeans, and his red hoodie was updated to incorporate more of a lightning bolt logo throughout the piece.

Arthur's costume was the easiest to create, as the color scheme mirrored his comic book counterpart, and was constructed to give a "wetsuit look". The costume was also designed to be more form-fitting, to complement Ritchson's physique. Victor and Arthur's tops were also hoodie variations. When designing Dinah Lance's Black Canary costume, certain aspects of the comic book character were kept, while others changed entirely. For instance, the character retains her classic fishnet stockings, but the external, black mask the character wears is swapped for a painted mask. Cranstoun researched the various versions of Black Canary's costume, looking through the 1940s and 50s, to try to come up with the right version for the show. Cranstoun explained that she primarily came across two versions. One version reminded the designer of a Playboy Bunny, with a "curvy, corseted, strapless thing that was not at all action-friendly". The other was more reminiscent of Lara Croft and Tank Girl, which is the route Cranstoun took. What Cranstoun created was a "zipped, sleeveless body suit with a boot that was really flat and practical". The designer also kept the yellow accents the comic version had, as well as the long gloves. The filming crew did test shots with various masks for the character, including a leather mask reminiscent of the comic book character's look, before going with the painted variation.

Hartley was quick to point out that before "Justice", the series did not focus on "the costumes and the capes, the flying and the superhero stuff", because they had their "no flights, no tights" rule in effect. That changed with "Justice", and Hartley suggested that the actors really had to commit themselves to their roles while wearing the costumes, "otherwise you look like a standup comedian who doesn't like his jokes very much". Young said that he was one of the luckiest out of the group, because he only had to wear a silver vest and regular pants, unlike Ritchson, who had to put on a "onesie Speedo". Ritchson felt that he was distracted by what he was wearing it, but it was best to try to take mind off of the subject. Hartley, Ritchson, and Young stated that they felt sorry for Gallner for having to wear a costume that they believed "sucked". The group described Gallner's costume as something his mom might have made with "some cotton fabric and a Magic Marker".

=== Creating superpowers ===
In order to illustrate the special abilities of the Justice League members, special effects company Entity FX had to come in and digitally create the powers for each character. Senior Producer at Entity FX, Trent Smith, explained that they wanted to give Bart's super speed a "more current" look, so they employed 3D techniques in conjunction with the 2D graphics from season four to create a "hybrid" image for the screen. Smith explained that the 3D technology allowed the team to "[choose] a path for [Bart] that he may not be able to achieve in the 2D composite world". Entity FX used Autodesk Maya and Adobe After Effects to create the 3D stream that follows Bart when he is running at super speed.

For Victor, Entity FX tried to create digital imagery of the character's inner workings to give the audience the chance to see how his robotic side operates. For instance, Entity FX visually walked the audience through the process of how Victor's CPU downloads the schematics and diagrams to Lex's Level 33.1 facility, as well as disarming the security. Creating abilities for Arthur posed their own challenges, as there were not a lot of opportunities to put the character in the water when he was in the Mid-West. Using the technology they had when Arthur first came to Smallville, as well as the effects used in the unaired pilot for Aquaman, Entity FX was able to digitally create both Arthur and the water he swims in for the character's arrival shot at Level 33.1. When creating Arthur's super swimming speed, the team attempted to give the imagery a look similar to that of a torpedo gliding through the water. The team battled back and forth on how to illustrate Arthur's movements, deciding between having the character leave a trail of bubbles like a torpedo, or "maneuvering around the water and...actually traveling with the bubbles".

== Reception ==
When judging individual appearances, DVD Verdict's Jennifer Malkowski felt that Alan Ritchson's performance as Arthur Curry in "Aqua" was rather "wooden", while Filip Vuckevic, of IGN, felt that the introductions for Victor Stone and Arthur Curry were simply wasted, as the characters are not "given anything to do" in the episodes. Commenting on the introduction of Oliver Queen's Green Arrow persona in the season six episode "Arrow", IGN's Chris Carabott felt that the series took its time developing a character that fit the style of the show. Carabott acknowledged that Green Arrow's costume, though not exactly like in the comics, respects the spirit of the character in its design; the gadgets he uses make it feel like the producers are taking a page out of the Justice League Unlimited book, which makes for "quality entertainment".

Carabott felt that Phil Morris did well as John Jones/Martian Manhunter but lacked a proper introduction: "Phil Morris does a respectable job of portraying John Jones in the few scenes we see him in. He lacks the screen presence of someone like Carl Lumbly, who voiced the character on Justice League, but Morris holds his own and delivers the lines in that strong, straight forward tone that is signature Manhunter". Alan Blair, editor of Airlock Alpha, felt that Smallville's approach to Black Canary succeeded where the television series Birds of Prey failed. First, Smallville dropped the idea of "meta-humans", which Blair believed is what doomed Birds of Prey, managed to make Black Canary look more like her comic book counterpart, and also give her Canary Cry "some level of credibility". Carabott acknowledged that Smallville created a "fairly good depiction" of Black Canary, but disagreed with certain aesthetical choices. First, Carabott did not appreciate the removal of Black Canary's long, blonde hair, or the addition of make-up around the eyes that gave the character the look of "Pris from Blade Runner". Carabott stated that Huffman's acting came off as "a little over-the-top at times", but overall he felt that she was the right choice for Smallville.

Carabott also had his own feelings about the first official "Justice League" appearance in season six's "Justice". The writer suggested that the first live-action appearance of the League since the failed pilot back in the 1990s deserved more than just a single episode. Carabott stated that at least two or three episodes would have been needed to properly tell the narrative of their introduction. Instead, he felt like the character introductions were rushed, even though they had all appeared on the series prior to season six. "Justice" would go on to earn the highest ratings of any episode in season six, with 5.26 million viewers.

== Merchandise ==
Following the end of the sixth season, DC Direct released new action figures, modeled after Smallville's Justice League as they appeared in the season six episode "Justice". The toys featured detailed likenesses of Welling, Hartley, Ritchson, Gallner, and Young.

== Other media appearances ==
=== Spin-offs ===
At various points throughout the series, the studio discussed developing individual shows for Bart, Oliver, Arthur, and the entire Justice League. The topic of a television series based on the Flash came underway a year before the character made his first appearance on Smallville. Writer Steven S. DeKnight said that there were creative differences over how a Flash television series should be handled, given the previous attempt at translating the character to the small screen in 1990. DeKnight explained that the studio wanted to create a Flash who was a "time-traveling college student from Gotham City". As a result, the series never materialized, and the character was ultimately brought to Smallville.

Following the appearance of Arthur Curry, which became one of the highest-rated episodes of that season, Smallville developers Al Gough and Miles Millar began work on an Aquaman pilot for The WB Television Network, with Justin Hartley as Arthur Curry. As work progressed on season five's "Aqua", the character was recognized to have potential for his own series. The season five episode was never meant to be a backdoor pilot for an Aquaman television spin-off, so, Alan Ritchson was never considered for the role. Gough stated in a November 2005 interview that the series would have put a different spin on the Aquaman mythology. Although Gough did not look at the new series as a true spin-off, he did suggest an interest in doing a crossover with Smallville. Aquaman is currently the only series to go into production, though it was ultimately not picked up by The CW network, which had formed from a merger between The WB and UPN during the production of the pilot.

During the sixth season, there was a talk about creating a new series based on the Green Arrow/Oliver Queen character. Hartley refused to talk about the possibility of a spin-off during the filming of the sixth season out of respect for his role on Smallville. The actor felt he should respect what Smallville had accomplished in five seasons, and not "steal the spotlight" by thinking he was better than he was just because there was "talk" of a spin-off after only two appearances on the show. According to Hartley, "talking" was as far as the spin-off ever got. Gough explained that the Green Arrow spin-off would have introduced the idea of Oliver acting in more of a "Professor X" role, where he takes in people with superpowers who have no place to go and trains them. The series would have used characters that would be more easily cleared by the film division at Warner Bros. As DeKnight clarified, the series would have featured the introduction of new characters—some from the Teen Titans and others from the DC Comics universe—as well as going into more depth for the background story of its primary characters, like Bart, Victor, and Arthur. As with the other potential series, this one never came to fruition.

=== Mobile phone/online tie-ins ===
Although the team's prominent appearances are on the television series, there have been additional media appearances based around marketing tie-ins. In early 2007, Oliver Queen received a personal treatment with a promotional tie-in with Sprint, titled Smallville Legends: The Oliver Queen Chronicles. The series looked at the origins of Oliver's alternate identity. On April 19, a tie-in with Toyota promoting their new Yaris featured an online comic strip as interstitial programs during new episodes of Smallville—titled Smallville Legends: Justice & Doom. The interactive comic was based on the episode "Justice", and picks up after the events of that episode, following Oliver, Bart, Victor and Arthur, as they seek to destroy all of LuthorCorp's secret experimental labs. The team eventually uncovers a prototype soldier LuthorCorp is working on, that combines the superpowers of various kryptonite enhanced individuals and places them into a single soldier. The online comic then directly ties-into the television series when Oliver and his team, off-screen, contact Clark in the episode "Prototype", and tell him how to defeat one of these soldiers. The online series allowed viewers to investigate alongside the fictional team in an effort to win prizes. Stephan Nilson wrote all five episodes, while working with a team of artists for the illustrations. The plot for each comic episode would be given to Nilson at the same time the production crew for Smallville was filming their current television episode. Artist Steve Scott would draw comic book panels, which would be sent to a group called Motherland. That group would review the drawings and tell Scott which images to draw on a separate overlay. This allowed for multiple objects to be moved in and out of the same frame. Before and after the first appearance of the League on Smallville, there were talks among studio heads about spinning off individual characters, or the entire team, into their own television shows, but nothing came to fruition. Smallville is the first series—television or film—to feature live-action portrayals of Aquaman, Green Arrow, and Cyborg.

=== Comic books ===
In 2012, the Smallville series was continued through the comic book medium with Smallville: Season 11. Written by Bryan Q. Miller, who also wrote for the television series, the first issues feature Chloe Sullivan referencing that they're trying to establish an info hub, linked the Watchtower, in every city inhabited by a member of the organization. In the second issue, Lex Luthor discovers that Queen Industries is building a facility on the far side of Earth's moon as a base for the team, and its construction is under John Jones' supervision. Despite seemingly having died after her encounter with Lex Luthor, the team's liaison is Tess Mercer, whose consciousness is revealed to be bonded to her half-brother's mind. Luthor sees this as an opportunity to learn the heroes' secrets before removing Tess from his mind and creates measures to prevent them from finding out his situations with Tess. Despite his efforts, Tess still manage to send her message to the team of her predicaments with Lex, and they extract her consciousness from him and uploaded it to the Watchtower computer system as a temporary home for her mind.

In issue five, the team begins to investigate the warning given by a parallel universe version of Chloe Sullivan about a "Crisis". Here is the first appearance of Bruce Wayne, who is secretly the vigilante Batman of Gotham City, whose father Thomas Wayne was invited to join the secret society, Veritas, by Lionel Luthor. Batman, along with his partner, Nightwing (Barbara Gordon), arrive to Metropolis in search of his parents' killer Joe Chill, who works as a contact for Intergang.

Bart Allen returns in the ninth issue, donning a new costume and explores the source of his powers: the Speed Force, as well as encountering the Black Flash from it while battling gorillas in Paris. Bart once again challenges Clark to a race, this time with the latter in flight. In the eleventh issue, it reveals that Bart got his powers after Jay Garrick refused to run, forcing the Speed Force's sentience to create a new speedster to take his place. In a story arc chronologically parallel to Clark and Bart's, while Batman and Nightwing chase members of the criminal gang in Gotham, the Mutants, the latter is attacked by a White Martian and left injured. John Jones appears and offers his assistance to Bruce on investigating the attack. Jones also adapts the superhero identity "Martian Manhunter". In addition, the new Watchtower outpost on the Moon is shown being built, and that S.T.A.R. Labs is helping Queen Industries in its construction, as well as using Emil Hamilton's Hazardous Environmental Drones as crew. It also reveals that Batman has joined the team.

During the series run, Bryan Q. Miller revealed that there is no formal Justice League. Rather there is Watchtower, which networks agents all over the world. This is reflected in the series, where the organization is regularly identified as the "Watchtower Network". The conclusion of the miniseries Smallville: Continuity sees the formation of the formal Justice League. The team is given a roster of Superman, Batman, Wonder Woman, Green Arrow, Green Lantern (John Stewart), Martian Manhunter and Red Tornado (Tess Mercer).
