= Lois Lane (Smallville) =

Fictional character from Smallville

- Smallville character
- Erica Durance as Lois Lane
- First appearance: "Crusade"; Smallville; September 22, 2004
- Last appearance: "Crisis on Infinite Earths, Part 2"; Batwoman; December 9, 2019
- Based on: Lois Lane by: Jerry Siegel; Joe Shuster
- Adapted by: Alfred Gough; Miles Millar
- Portrayed by: Erica Durance

In-universe information
- Species: Human
- Affiliations: Daily Planet

Lois Lane is a fictional character on the television series Smallville; she was portrayed continually by Erica Durance since her first appearance in the season four premier "Crusade" to the series finale. Durance began as a guest star in season four but was promoted to series regular status beginning in season five. The character of Lois Lane, first created for comic books by Jerry Siegel and Joe Shuster in 1938 to be the love interest for Clark Kent and his alter-ego Superman, was adapted to television in 2001 by Alfred Gough and Miles Millar - this is the fourth time the character has been adapted into a live-action television series.

In Smallville, Lois comes to town to investigate the apparent death of her cousin Chloe Sullivan at the start of the fourth season. After finding Chloe still alive, Lois is forced to enroll in Smallville High to complete the remaining credits of high school she failed to achieve. As the series progresses, her interest in journalism grows, first writing a couple of articles for the Smallville High Torch in season four, landing a job at the Inquisitor in season six, and finally being hired at the Daily Planet in season seven. Throughout seasons four, five, six and seven, Lois's relationship with Clark Kent is depicted more as a brother and sister relationship, with the two characters often butting heads and teasing each other. By season eight, Lois begins to realize that she is falling in love with Clark, and by season nine the two become an official couple. During season ten the relationship goes through several milestones and midseason the pair get engaged.

Series developers Gough and Millar had always envisioned bringing the character of Lois Lane to Smallville, but it was not until the end of season three that the creative team had the right storyline to bring her in. Erica Durance was hired to portray the iconic female reporter from the comic books. Smallville's interpretation of Lois was designed to embody similar traits to that of various leading female characters in the film. Described as "fiercely independent", critics have favorably compared this version of Lois Lane against the other live-action performances of the character in both film and television.

== Role in Smallville ==
Lois Lane makes her first appearance in season four's "Crusade" when she comes to Smallville investigating the death of her cousin Chloe Sullivan (Allison Mack). While investigating Chloe's death with Clark Kent (Tom Welling) in "Gone", the pair uncover the truth that Chloe is still alive, but in witness protection until Lionel Luthor's trial, the man she is testifying against with evidence that he orchestrated the death of his own parents. Lionel (John Glover) discovers the truth and sends someone to kill her, but Lois and Clark stop the would-be killer, allowing Chloe to testify. Before Lois can leave Smallville, her father (Michael Ironside) informs her that she failed to achieve all of her high school credits and that he has enrolled her in Smallville High so that she can complete her twelfth-grade year. Staying with the Kents, Lois begins attending Smallville High. In "Faςade", Chloe convinces her to become a reporter for the Torch in an effort to help Lois earn some of her remaining credits. With Lex Luthor's (Michael Rosenbaum) help in the episode "Devoted", Clark manages to get Lois her remaining credits ahead of schedule so that she can attend Metropolis University, and vacate his bedroom.

In season five's "Fanatic", Jonathan Kent (John Schneider), who is running for the state senate, asks Lois to be his campaign manager after witnessing her take charge against his former campaign manager, whom Jonathan fires when he published a statement that goes against Jonathan's values. In "Fragile", Lois continues her duties under Martha Kent (Annette O'Toole), who is requested by the Governor to take Jonathan's place after he suffers a fatal heart attack. In season six's "Sneeze", Lois discovers an interest in journalism after she is almost struck by a barn door that falls out of the sky while she is jogging. Her story is bought by the Inquisitor, a tabloid newspaper that gives her a job as a reporter. In "Wither", she begins a romantic relationship with billionaire Oliver Queen (Justin Hartley), who, unbeknown to her, masquerades at night as the vigilante Green Arrow. Queen's "job" as Green Arrow often gets in the way of their relationship. In "Hydro", Lois deduces that Oliver is Green Arrow, setting up an elaborate scheme to prove it. Clark and Oliver are wise to her plan, however, and Clark dresses up as Green Arrow to throw Lois off Oliver's trail. When Oliver is forced to leave Metropolis to track down all of Lex's experimental facilities, in the episode "Justice", his relationship with Lois comes to an end. In season six's "Prototype", Lois discovers that Lex has been doing experimental research on army soldiers, one of which was her best friend. As a result, Lois decides in "Phantom" to begin looking into Lex's LuthorCorp projects.

In season seven's "Kara", while looking into Lex's research projects, Lois discovers an alien spaceship. Her attempt to craft a news story out of the situation lands her a job at the Daily Planet - in the basement alongside her cousin Chloe. While at the Daily Planet, Lois begins a new relationship with her editor Grant Gabriel (Michael Cassidy) in the episode "Wrath". Their relationship comes under scrutiny from Chloe and Lex in "Blue", with Chloe seeing it as a reason for co-workers to doubt Lois's true ability as a journalist, and Lex believing it will jeopardize the secret of Grant's true identity. In "Gemini", the two finally agree to part ways. In the season eight premiere, Lois believes that Lex is responsible for Chloe's arrest by the Department of Domestic Security, and goes to his mansion to search his files for her location. She eventually discovers Chloe's whereabouts and arrives, alongside Clark, to save her. In "Plastique", Lois takes Clark under her wing—teaching him how to be a reporter—after he accepts an internship at the Daily Planet, sitting at the desk directly across from Lois. Her feelings for Clark become stronger as the season progresses, admitting in the episode "Committed" that she is in love with Clark, and stating to Oliver in the episode "Bride" that she has never felt this way about someone before. In the same episode, she almost shares a kiss with Clark before being interrupted by the arrival of Clark's ex-girlfriend Lana Lang (Kristin Kreuk). In the season eight finale, Lois and Tess Mercer (Cassidy Freeman), Lex Luthor's handpicked successor to LuthorCorp, get into a physical fight at the Daily Planet. During the fight, Lois picks up a Legion ring that falls out of Clark's desk and is instantly transported to another time and place.

In season nine, Lois returns from the future suffering from visions of Earth having been overrun by aliens, led by Zod (Callum Blue). This season, Lois and Clark officially begin a romantic relationship, while Lois also begins assisting "The Blur" in his heroic endeavors. Lois's trust in Clark is shaken when she thinks Clark is jealous of her relationship with "The Blur", and that he does not understand her need to find value in her own life's work. Ultimately, Lois deduces Clark's true identity as "The Blur" in the season nine finale. Lois and Clark's relationship reaches its peak in the tenth and final season. Clark finally confesses his secret to her in "Isis" and they begin their relationship again free of secrets. He proposed marriage in "Icarus". In the episode "Beacon", with Chloe's help, Lois rallies faithful fans of "The Blur" and repeals the Vigilante Registration Act (VRA), helping Clark and the Justice League preserve their secret identities. In "Masquerade" and "Booster", Lois convinces Clark to develop an alter-ego as a way of hiding his true identity as the heroic "Blur". In the episode "Prophecy", Lois is given Clark's powers for a day, as a wedding gift by his biological father Jor-El, and realizes that the devotion they have for each other is Clark's greatest weakness, and calls off the wedding. In the series finale, Clark convinces Lois that her being in his life makes him stronger, but the ceremony is interrupted by Darkseid's sudden invasion of the Earth. Lois convinces the US military not to bomb Darkseid's homeworld of Apokolips, allowing Clark to finally embrace his destiny and defeat Darkseid himself.

== Portrayal ==
Series developer Al Gough contends that it was always the producer's intention to bring in the iconic Lois Lane, but they needed a good reason to do it—Chloe's supposed death at the end of season three appeared to be that reason. Gough explains that, when casting for the role, they looked to Margot Kidder—Lois Lane in the Superman film series—for inspiration. They wanted an actress who was "pretty", "smart", and who came with some "wit". Dozens of actresses auditioned for the role of Lois Lane, but it was not until a tape from Erica Durance showed up that everyone felt that they had found the right Lois. Executive producer Greg Beeman described Durance as tough, sexy and direct for her role. Another plus, according to Beeman, was the chemistry between Durance and Tom Welling. Durance came on set that first afternoon and the two hit it off, becoming friends and developing a brother/sister relationship on the set.

The lateness of her casting forced Durance to start filming only three days after being hired, with no time to prepare for the role. Under the initial agreement, Durance was only to portray the character for a total of four episodes, but, after a discussion with Peter Roth over how they planned to use the character on the show—insisting that she and Clark would not be having a romantic relationship—the feature film division then cleared the character for more episodes. After the character was cleared for more episodes, the creative team decided to plant her in the Kent home so that she could provide a constant annoyance to Clark. To separate the physical appearance of Lana and Lois from each other, the producers had highlights added to Durance's hair, as she and Kristin Kreuk both shared a similar brunette coloring.

== Character development ==
=== Storyline ===
Series writer Brian Peterson discusses how the writing staff chose to develop the character: "In the Smallville pilot, Al and Miles established Lex and Clark as best friends, which is, to me, one of the best aspects of the show. So when you're introducing his future love interest, why not introduce her, not as an enemy, but as the one who is constantly going to butt heads with him, where they're not gonna like each other at all at first? I think that because we chose such a different take on her, it wasn't that intimidating. She could grow into the person that everybody sees on-screen later". For season six, the writers chose to start Lois down the path of investigative journalism, only in this version of the character she gets her start working for a tabloid newspaper. Writer Kelly Souders felt that if tabloid beginnings were good enough for Perry White—an additional character established in season three's "Perry"—then they are good enough for Lois Lane. It adds depth to the character by showing how she struggled before becoming "the reporter we all know and love". As Lois steps closer to her ultimate destiny at the Daily Planet, the writers have continued to evolve the character by having her grow out of the "black and white" mindset and have her begin seeing shades of gray. The writers wanted the character to realize that there is sometimes a middle road that has to be taken. In season eight, Durance sees Clark taking a job at the Daily Planet as a chance for her character to "step it up and be more involved". In this case, Lois is acting more mature, taking charge in being a mentor to Clark as he transitions into his new job. Durance describes the eighth season as a lesson in duality, with Clark realizing that he has to be two different people if he wants to have a life and save the day; Durance believes that the same applies to Lois. As Durance explains, "[Lois has] got her confidence as a journalist and on the inside, she's going oh my god I'm truly in love with [Clark], more in love than I've ever been with anyone".

=== Characteristics ===
When developing the characteristics of their version of Lois Lane, the writers took inspiration from other leading ladies in cinema, for example, Karen Allen's character Marion Ravenwood, from Raiders of the Lost Ark. Todd Slavkin describes the character as having a "sophisticated, worldly experience", and was considered to be more of an adult than the rest of the cast. Durance believes that she embodies many of the characteristics that the creative team wanted to show in their version of Lois, specifically the fact that Lois has a lot of "nervous energy" from trying to "find herself", the same nervous energy that Durance brings to the role. The actress also relates to Lois's sassy, and independent nature, but, conversely, she is not as extroverted as Lois. Gough describes the character as coming from the school of hard knocks; she is street smart, and a very capable woman. Durance believes her character is "fiercely independent", but at the same time she is not afraid to admit that she has flaws, and she is only human; Lois also does not feel sorry about having those flaws. She goes into further detail, identifying the character as more of a tomboy who is vulnerable, with Gough adding that she is also "slightly neurotic". BuddyTV's John Kubicek characterizes her as a fast-talking woman, who, though she whines over petty annoyances, can take care of herself. He goes on to further describe how she is not afraid of getting herself into trouble just so she can dig herself out.

=== Relationships ===
One of Lois's key relationships is with Clark, who is her husband in the comics. For Smallville, the characters' relationship is in constant development. Darren Swimmer describes the relationship between Lois and Clark in season five as "a bit of a melting of the ice". The two characters continue to "butt heads", but the audience can see where there is a growing attraction and that either would be there for the other in a time of need. According to Erica Durance, in season five it is not yet clear if either character realizes the attraction, but the joking between the two characters represents a foreshadowing of a greater relationship. Durance believes that because of Lois's self-imposed walls, even if she thought about Clark in a romantic notion for just an instant she would immediately make it out to be a joke because she is not ready for that type of closeness, yet. The actress sees season five as being too soon for the characters to be "in-love" because they are still getting to know each other. Writer Brian Peterson describes Lois's relationship with Oliver Queen in season six as a precursor to her future relationship with Clark. As Peterson sees it, it is the dynamic between her and Oliver, with her willingness to accept Oliver's secret identity as Green Arrow as mirroring the relationship she will have with Clark. As far as season six is concerned, the relationship between Lois and Clark is still undefined for the audience. As Durance describes it, neither character is willing to put an official label on their relationship. The pair has learned to deal with each other's "quirks", but there are still moments that both feel uncomfortable with. Instead at this point, Durance believes that Clark and Lois are satisfied with identifying with a "brother-sister friendship" label, than trying to discover how they both truly feel about each other.

== Reception ==
Erica Durance has been nominated for two Saturn Award nominations in the Best Supporting Actress category for her performance as Lois Lane. The first came in 2005, after her first season with the show, and then again the following year. Before the end of Smallville's seventh season, IGN's Daniel Phillips compared the actresses who have portrayed the character of Lois Lane over the past three decades. Up against the most recognizable version of Lois Lane, Margot Kidder, the 2006 film incarnation played by Kate Bosworth, and the previous live-action television version portrayed by Teri Hatcher, Erica Durance was rated the highest. Although Phillips acknowledges that Kidder is the best representation of Lois' personality, he claims that Durance is the best overall embodiment of the character. Apart from her beauty, Phillips states that "Durance makes Lois intelligent, capable, funny and dangerously curious – exactly the type of woman Clark Kent would fall for". Mike Moody of TV Squad named Lois as one of five reasons to watch Smallville's eighth season. Moody believes that Durance's Lois is "one of the best versions of the character" because Durance plays her as "tough, brainy, sexy and catty", which makes her portrayal that much better than Kate Bosworth's Lois Lane in Superman Returns. BuddyTV's John Kubicek likens the actress's performance—her "stylized delivery of lines"—to that of actresses from the 1940s screwball comedy era.

== Other media appearances ==
=== Comic books ===
In 2012, the Smallville series was continued through the comic book medium with Smallville: Season 11. Written by Bryan Q. Miller, who also wrote for the television series, Lois's story continues as she lives her life with Clark, who has now become known to the world as "Superman". Her involvement with Clark also allows her to meet Gotham City's elusive vigilante Batman, and subsequently learn his secret identity and befriend Batman's partner Nightwing (Barbara Gordon). She also teams up with the Amazon Princess Diana Prince, and DEO's agent Steve Trevor was one of Lois's former boyfriends.

When Lois accepts an assignment to Africa to investigate mysterious reports surrounding a vigilante, known as "Angel of the Plateau". She is caught in a terrorist attack after her arrival but is saved by Lana, who is revealed to be the superheroine Lois investigates. After they are acquainted, Lois learns that Lana has been using her abilities to protect children from people who would exploit them, but Lois tries to keep the fact that Clark is now in the relationship with her from Lana. Both Lois and Lana also find themselves targeted by the latter's enemies, and they send John Corben to defeat Lana. Lois helps the powerless Lana in defeating Corben, and Lana reveals that she knows about her relationship with Clark as she saw the engagement ring before Lois hid it. Lois receives the blessing from Lana. After Oliver and Chloe's son Jonathan is born, they named Lois and Clark as the child's godparents.

=== Arrowverse ===
Durance reprised her role as Lois Lane in the 2019 Arrowverse crossover event, "Crisis on Infinite Earths". In the second episode of the crossover event, she appears after Earth-38 Lex Luthor retreats after failing to kill Clark. She thinks Clark is joking when he tells her about the looming destruction of the multiverse. Lois and Clark are now married with young daughters living on the Kent farm, and Clark gave up his powers for his family.
