= Absolute Justice =

- Smallville episode
- Promotional poster featuring (L-R) Doctor Fate, Stargirl, Clark Kent, Green Arrow, and Hawkman
- Episode no.: Season 9 Episode 11
- Directed by: Glen Winter ("Society"); Tom Welling ("Legends")
- Written by: Geoff Johns
- Production code: 3X5261/3X5262
- Original air date: February 5, 2010
- Running time: 84 minutes

Guest appearances
- Pam Grier as Amanda Waller; Phil Morris as John Jones; Alessandro Juliani as Dr. Emil Hamilton; Michael Shanks as Carter Hall / Hawkman; Brent Stait as Kent Nelson / Doctor Fate; Britt Irvin as Courtney Whitmore / Stargirl; Wesley MacInnes as Icicle; Jim Shields as Sylvester Pemberton / Star-Spangled Kid

Episode chronology
← Previous "Disciple"	Next → "Warrior"
- Smallville season 9

"Absolute Justice" is the eleventh episode of the ninth season of the American television series Smallville, and the 185th episode of the overall series. The episode originally aired on The CW on February 5, 2010 in the United States, and was initially slated to be two individual episodes before it was ultimately turned into a double-length single episode. Glen Winter directed the first half, originally known as "Society", while series star Tom Welling directed the second half, which was called "Legends". Comic book author Geoff Johns, who wrote the season eight episode "Legion", wrote both parts of "Absolute Justice".

In the episode's narrative, Clark Kent (Welling), Chloe Sullivan (Allison Mack), Oliver Queen / Green Arrow (Justin Hartley) and John Jones (Phil Morris) meet a team of superheroes, the Justice Society of America (JSA), who operated during the 1970s. The JSA is being hunted by the assassin Icicle (Wesley MacInnes), who was recruited by the organization Checkmate, led by Amanda Waller (Pam Grier). Clark, Chloe, Oliver, and John team up with the JSA members to battle Icicle.

The introduction of the JSA was developed to be relevant to the series, primarily being used to teach the new generation of superheroes—Clark, Oliver, and the rest of their team—a lesson about family and leadership. Johns modeled his vision of the JSA after the film Watchmen (2009), where a group of superheroes come out of retirement. He also included references to other JSA members throughout the episode. "Absolute Justice" is Smallville's highest-rated episode for season nine in total viewers, adults 18–49, and men 18–49. The episode received generally mixed reviews from critics; while praise was given to the guest characters' backstories, criticism was dealt for what was perceived as a poor choice of a villain.

== Plot ==
As Chloe tries to get in touch with Clark, she finds herself cornered in an alleyway by a man named Sylvester Pemberton, who is wielding a staff that has the ability to control light. As Sylvester attempts to inform Chloe that he is a friend, an assassin known as Icicle attacks and Sylvester is ultimately killed. Chloe and Clark go to the hospital to investigate the truth behind Sylvester, which ultimately leads them to the Daily Planet archive room. There, Clark and Chloe discover documents and an old 16 mm film that identifies Sylvester as part of a team of "criminals", which includes: Carter Hall, Kent Nelson, Jay Garrick, Alan Scott, Ted Grant, Abigail Hunkel, Wesley Dodds, and Al Pratt. In the documentary footage, Sylvester and the rest of his team are systematically arrested. Because of allegations of jury tampering, falsified evidence, and lack of connection, all of the individuals are released.

While Clark and Chloe are looking into the criminal group, Icicle tracks down and kills Dodds following Dodds' dream about him; Clark later finds Dodds' body. Following Dodds' death, Clark tracks down Carter, believing him to be Icicle's next target. Clark finds Carter at a museum; he also finds Nelson, who is mumbling incoherently to himself and clutching onto a small bag. Using his X-ray vision, Clark sees a helmet inside the bag, which turns on its own and looks back at Clark. Having enough of Clark's questions, Carter sends Clark on his way.

Meanwhile, Chloe sends Oliver after Sylvester's staff. Unfortunately, high school sophomore Courtney Whitmore has already taken it. Before Oliver can get the staff from her, Nelson shows up and uses the staff to teleport both him and Courtney back to the museum. Here, it is revealed that Sylvester's team was actually a group of superheroes led by Carter, who went by the codename Hawkman. The group called themselves the Justice Society of America. Courtney, who was Sylvester's protégé, Nelson, and Carter band together to find Sylvester's killer. As such, Nelson places the Helmet of Nabu back on and transforms into Doctor Fate.

After investigating Dodds and Sylvester's deaths, Clark and Chloe believe they have located the killer at the psychiatric ward of Metropolis General Hospital. When they arrive, they find the individual, Joar Mahkent, in a vegetative state and Nelson reading his mind. Nelson sees Clark's fate and teleports Clark and himself to the museum. Meanwhile, the real assassin is revealed to be Joar's son, who is killing the Justice Society members for putting his father in that vegetative state decades earlier. Hired by an organization known as Checkmate, and instructed by Agent Amanda Waller, Icicle sets his sights on Courtney. Oliver tracks down Courtney—who calls herself Stargirl—and realizes that she is setting herself up as bait to lure Icicle out. Icicle arrives, but Oliver interrupts Courtney's plan. As a result, Carter grabs Oliver, throws him through the Watchtower window, and threatens to do worse if Oliver interferes again.

Meanwhile, Checkmate sends Lois Lane an anonymous package that provides her with the truth about the Justice Society. Clark awakens at the museum, where Nelson informs Clark that his fate is to lead a new generation of superheroes, and that he will one day conquer his greatest enemy, Lex Luthor. Oliver and John Jones show up at the museum to rescue Clark, unaware that Carter, Nelson, and Courtney are actually heroes. Banding together, the group splits up into pairs to locate Icicle. While on patrol, Nelson and John are attacked by Icicle. Before Nelson is killed, he uses his abilities to restore John's Martian powers. While John lies unconscious, Icicle steals Nelson's helmet and acquires the powers that go with it.

Clark and the others regroup at Watchtower, where Icicle arrives to kill the rest of the Justice Society and avenge his father. At first, Clark, Carter, Courtney, and Oliver have trouble taking down Icicle and his new abilities. When John arrives, the group is finally able to defeat Icicle. Afterward, Carter tells Clark that he and Courtney have located the surviving members of the Justice Society, their children, and their protégés in order to build a new team of superheroes for the current generation. Back at the Daily Planet after having been visited by Waller, Lois publishes her article on the Justice Society, revealing them to be a team of superheroes who were lambasted by the government and falsely imprisoned. Icicle is transported back to Checkmate. With Icicle in a heated cage, Waller kills him. Afterward, she meets with Tess, revealed to be an agent of Checkmate.

== Production ==
=== Development ===
The idea of introducing the Justice Society of America was first made public at the 2009 San Diego Comic Con, where producers announced that comic book author Geoff Johns would write the episode. Johns had previously introduced the Legion of Super-Heroes in the season eight episode "Legion". As Johns worked on the script for the Justice Society episode, which was titled "Society", it was decided that in order to do the characters justice, the story would be extended into two separate episodes, with the second episode titled "Legends". Executive producer Kelly Souders explained that "there were so many characters and so much great story that people would've been robbed of some great moments if we kept it to just one hour". According to executive producer Brian Peterson, he and Johns realized there was so much material for one episode that they decided to make it into two. Peterson describes the episodes as a "mini-movie", and referred to it as one of the most exciting things they have done on Smallville in nine years.

Ultimately, the idea of two separate episodes was scrapped in favor of combining them into a single episode. The CW then marketed the episode as a two-hour television movie titled Smallville: Absolute Justice. Following the episode's airing, the Smallville writers announced on their Twitter page that they still consider "Absolute Justice" to be two separately produced episodes, but was aired and packaged on the season nine DVD as a single episode. For the Complete Series DVD package released in November 2011, Warner Bros. Home Video acknowledged the two separate episodes in their official count of 218 episodes. When the series was released on the Hulu streaming service in October 2016, the episodes were split in two, labelled "Absolute Justice, Part 1 - Society" and "Absolute Justice, Part 2 - Legends", with both being recognized as episode eleven of season nine.

Michael Shanks, Brent Stait, and Brittney Irvin were cast as Justice Society members Carter Hall / Hawkman, Kent Nelson / Doctor Fate, and Courtney Whitmore / Stargirl, respectively. Shanks took the role because he did not think he would get many opportunities to play a superhero in the future. Pam Grier made a special guest appearance as Amanda Waller, a character from DC Comics, and Phil Morris was brought back as John Jones, a recurring character Morris has portrayed since season six.

=== Writing ===
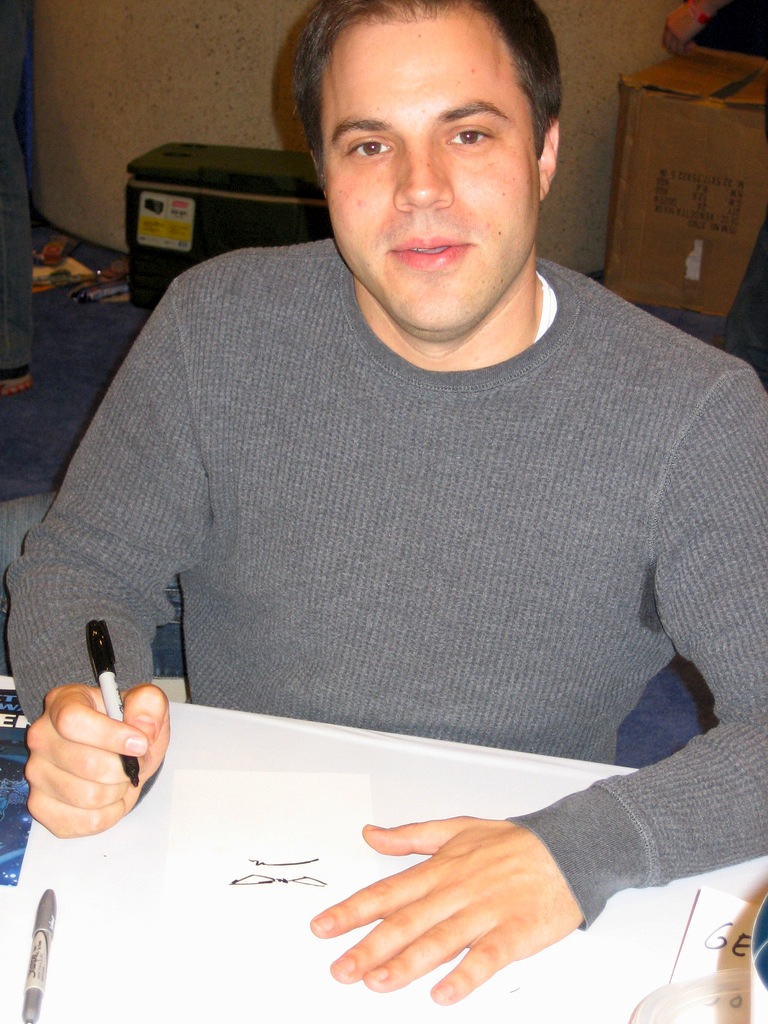
Comic book writer Geoff Johns wrote the script for the episode. Johns previously wrote the season eight episode "Legion".

As the script for "Absolute Justice" was developed by Johns, Peterson explained that he wanted the entrance for the Justice Society to be relevant to the series. Peterson felt that the Justice Society should teach the new generation of heroes—Clark Kent, Oliver Queen, and the rest of their team—a lesson about family and leadership. Peterson also stated that the mid-season episode "Disciple" was written so that it could set the table for "Absolute Justice" and reveal that the series' heroes were not coalescing the way they need to be. Johns described his version of the Justice Society to be similar to the heroes of the film Watchmen (2009), who "come out of retirement to give 'the screwed-up guys of the next generation a needed smack down'".

When it came time to translate the comic book Justice Society members into live-action characters, Johns said that he tried to keep everyone exactly the same. Johns noted that Hawkman and Stargirl are virtual duplicates of their comic book counterparts, but that Doctor Fate "took on a life of his own" when Johns was writing him. Johns said that Nelson is portrayed as being in a "different place and head space than he is in the comics". Regardless of any differences between where the characters were in their respective lives, Johns stated that they both still "embody the same values and traits". Johns also noted that he almost did not use the character of Doctor Fate. While he was developing the initial concept for the story, and meeting with Peterson and Souders, there were no restrictions on the characters he could use. The idea of using Wildcat or Jay Garrick was floated around, but Johns believed he had a unique approach to the Doctor Fate character. He also believed that Doctor Fate fit into the storyline better than Wildcat or Garrick.

Johns chose to write in as much detail as possible, because he wanted to create a full sense of history for the characters. This included specific paintings, cards, tables, and how their costumes appeared. Johns also included mentionings of former members and relatives of the current members. The executive producers embraced his ideas completely. In addition, Johns researched where the Smallville writers had taken the series since the last time he wrote an episode, although he acknowledged that he did not have the plan to incorporate the primary storyline of season nine. Johns' initial script pushed the production budget to the max. According to Johns: "By turning the story into two episodes, it not only allowed the story to get bigger, but it allowed our budget to become bigger".

=== Character designs ===
Shanks wears the traditional Hawkman uniform, complete with strap-on wings and Hawkman's mace. He spent time practicing his wire work for the flying scenes that he would have to film while in full costume. One difference in the costume is the inclusion of a chest plate. The costume designers added it to assist the flying harness they created. The chest plate and Hawkman's helmet were given a bronze color, as opposed to the more traditional "yellow/gold" color. Shanks, who was accustomed to the chaos of a weekly television series, was surprised to find so much attention paid to a guest role. Shanks said producer James Marshall respected and took into consideration some of his artistic input. He also said that his character's return for future episodes was a "strong possibility". Johns stated that their costumes worked because the Justice Society members were from the generation before Clark and his allies.

== Reception ==
Nielsen Ratings for "Absolute Justice" came in at approximately 2.77 million viewers, which is Smallville's highest-rated episode for season nine in total viewers, adults 18–49, and men 18–49, a 7% increase from the season nine premiere, which had 2.58 million viewers.

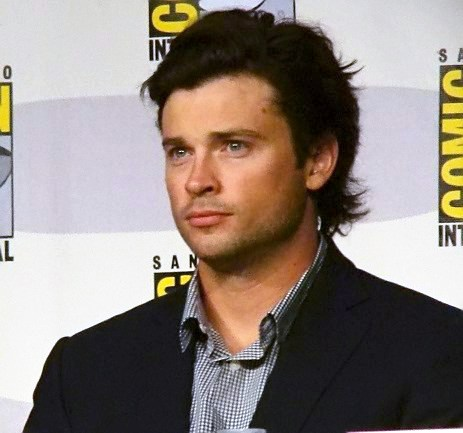
Star Tom Welling directed the second part of the episode.

Reviews for the episode were generally mixed. Carlos Delgado of IFMagazine gave the episode a B+, stating that "'Absolute Justice' was ambitious. A two hour defibrillation trying to restore a pulse to a show that had been relegated to the Friday night death slot. It takes guts to air something that could so easily make or break a season. Two hours of garbage, the show is done. Two hours of comic book bliss, well, let's just say contracts might be written up that very night to secure the next phase of the Man of Steel's odyssey. Yes, it was that big". He said that Icicle was a weak antagonist but mentioned that "Absolute Justice" was a success. Anthony Ocasio from ScreenRant went as far as deeming "Absolute Justice" one of the best episodes of Smallville in its nine years of being on the air, writing that "it was wonderful to see that guest characters could be on Smallville with a backstory that's more than the normal "guess who just happened to come to Metropolis". He voiced his opinion against the antagonist, Icicle, and called the actor who portrayed the character "poor", and stated he "got goose bumps", regarding his fate at the hands of Clark.

Reviewer Graeme McMillan praised Welling's directing, while calling Clark the character who was the least fun of the episode; he praised Johns, saying that "there was a sense of scale and history to the episode that the series doesn't usually manage". When talking about the Justice Society, he said: "They brought with them — or, more likely, Geoff Johns did — a banter and wit that the show often lacks, and also a speed and lightness that worked better than the show's usual po-faced drama.... the show just seemed better than usual". He concluded his review by saying that even though the special effects were disappointing, the episode was fun. Ken Tucker from Entertainment Weekly said the first hour of the episode contained the "stand-out visual sequence" and thought the second hour was "more lumbering", with the big fight sequence toward the end "unsatisfying". Tucker wrote: "For viewers who only know the Superman/boy mythos according to Smallville, it must have seemed strange to have most of the series' ongoing subplots put in storage for this week's two-hour edition. Then again, since the villain of this piece was a faux-hawked foe called the Icicle, frozen plotlines were inevitable". Reviewer Blair Marnell said: "For longtime comic fans, catching all of the comic references was part of the fun, including Radu's Cafe from "Green Lantern", the "Trouble Alert" from the classic Super Friends animated series, and Pemberton's "Star-Rocket Racer", which also served as the home for the fallen hero". He said the episode approached an "epic scale not seen in the series for a long time" and criticized the "raspy voice" of "Hawkman". In concluding the review, he wrote that he enjoyed slight nods to the comics and thought the episode could have been told in one hour. Reviewer Chris Carabott praised "Absolute Justice", saying that it brings various members of the Justice Society to life on the small screen and it does it brilliantly. He applauded writer Johns, saying he "outdoes himself with a story that pays homage to the early days of some of DC's finest". While stating disapproval among the costumes, he said Doctor Fate's "gold helmet contrasted by the dark blue of the costume looked fantastic in HD". He also called the episode "a great achievement" and said it is "fun to watch for both long time DC Comics fans and Smallville fans".

Author Joe Oesterle said that it was odd how in a major city like Metropolis, main characters were the only ones out on the streets. He expressed disappointment with the Sandman's death: "I'd have liked to see some old school Sandman roughhouse, and I felt cheated when a...Golden Age legend like Sandman goes to his eternal rest without so much as a single blast from his gas gun. I suppose the argument could be made to say that's how formidable Icicle Jr. was, or how rusty Sandman was, but I'm not buying that. Sandman deserved to go down fighting, not frozen solid while frozen in hesitation". While criticizing the episode, he compared the episode to the film Watchmen (2009) and disapproved of the "Batman" voice the Hawkman had. He also said that there should have been more John and less Lois. While praising the episode, he approved of Waller and said that Tess became a lethal hand-to-hand combatant. He concluded by saying that the episode did not live up to its hype and thought the episode before it, "Disciple", was "Grade A entertainment" in comparison. One reviewer praised the show by saying Smallville is "quietly having its best season in at least 5 years". He said the show currently did not resemble its former self and played more like a graphic novel. He called Hawkman "excellent" but also disapproved of the "Christian Bale"-Batman voice; he called Doctor Fate "awesome".

Brad Trechak from TVSquad had a negative review: "Admittedly, the episode was kind of light on story and ended up having major plot-holes, the least of which being how exactly "Hawkman"'s helmet stayed on". He compared the episode to Watchmen and asked why the Justice Society were scared of Icicle, and thought that the show creators could have used Vandal Savage or another menacing villain. He compared Doctor Fate's death with possible foreshadowing of the early death of Chloe. He ended by stating: "The episode didn't quite live up to the hype, but it was close enough".
