= Doomsday (DC Comics) =

DC Comics supervillain

- Doomsday as he appeared in Superman/Doomsday: Hunter/Prey #2 (May 1994). Art by Dan Jurgens (pencils), Brett Breeding (inks), and Greg Wright (colors).

Publication information
- Publisher: DC Comics
- First appearance: Cameo: Superman: The Man of Steel #17 (November 1992); Full appearance: Superman: The Man of Steel #18 (December 1992)
- Created by: Dan Jurgens; Brett Breeding; Jerry Ordway; Louise Simonson; Roger Stern

In-story information
- Species: Prehistoric Kryptonian
- Place of origin: Krypton
- Notable aliases: The Ultimate; The Destroyer; Dooms-D
- Abilities: Superhuman strength, stamina, durability, speed, and leaping; Healing factor; Adaptive evolution; Immortality; Controlled bone growth; Telescopic vision

Doomsday is a supervillain appearing in American comic books published by DC Comics. Created by Dan Jurgens, the character first made a cameo appearance in Superman: The Man of Steel #17 (November 1992) before being fully introduced in Superman: The Man of Steel #18 (December 1992). He has become one of the most enduring enemies belonging to Superman's rogues gallery. Doomsday ranked as #46 on IGN's list of the Top 100 Comic Book Villains of All Time. The character is best known as Superman's killer in the 1992 storyline, "The Death of Superman".

Doomsday appears in the film Batman v Superman: Dawn of Justice, where he was portrayed by Robin Atkin Downes through voice acting and motion capture.

== Publication history ==
Concept art for Doomsday by Dan Jurgens.

Doomsday was conceived in 1991 during an annual brainstorming session with the editors and writers of Superman comics, in response to a concern by some writers that most of Superman's foes either relied on technology or their intellect to outmaneuver Superman or had some natural advantage against him, wanting to create a new foe with great physical power to match him. Several writers proposed having Superman die at the hands of a "bestial foe", and editor Mike Carlin scribbled this idea on the wall chart as "doomsday for Superman". Inspired, they chose "Doomsday" as the name for this villain.

Doomsday had a cameo appearance in Superman: The Man of Steel #17 (November 1992) and made his first full appearance in Superman: The Man of Steel #18 (December 1992).

== Fictional character biography ==
Doomsday is depicted as a monstrous genetically engineered being from the depths of prehistoric Krypton. His creator imbued him with few feelings, mostly hate and desire for destruction, which led to his destroying worlds and eventually finding Earth, where he met Superman. The character is best known as Superman's killer in the 1992 storyline, "The Death of Superman".

=== The Ultimate Killing Machine ===
Originally known as "The Ultimate", Doomsday was born in prehistoric times on Krypton, long before the humanoid Kryptonian race gained dominance over the planet about 250,000 years ago. It was at that time a violent, hellish world, where only the absolute strongest of creatures could survive. In a cruel experiment involving evolution, intended to create the perfect living being, the alien scientist Bertron released a humanoid infant (born in vitro in a lab) onto the surface of the planet, where he was promptly killed by the harsh environment. The baby's remains were collected and used to clone a stronger version. This process was repeated over and over for decades as a form of accelerated natural evolution. The agony of these repeated deaths was recorded in his genes, driving the being insane and instilling hatred of all life.

Doomsday in promotional artwork for DC Comics T-shirts, art by Dan Jurgens and Brett Breeding.

As it evolved, the child eventually became able to survive the high temperatures and searing atmosphere, only to be quickly slain by the vicious predators that inhabited the planet. Over time, and without the assistance of Bertron's technology, he gained the ability to thrive on solar energy without the need for food or air, to return to life and adapt to overcome whatever had previously killed him. The Ultimate hunted and exterminated the dangerous predators of Krypton. He then killed Bertron, whom he had come to identify as an enemy.

The Ultimate escaped Krypton via a ship that regularly arrived to deliver supplies to Bertron and went on a killing spree across several planets. Eventually, the Ultimate arrived on the planet Calaton, whose royal family killed him. The Ultimate's seemingly dead body was suited and shackled to prevent his spirit from escaping into the afterlife, and he was shot into space because the murders he committed made him unworthy of burial on Calaton. Eventually, his casket crashed on Earth, the force of the impact driving it deep underground.

=== The Death of Superman ===
Doomsday's first full appearance, on the cover of Superman: The Man of Steel #18 (December 1992); art by Jon Bogdanove and Dennis Janke.

After freeing one arm and breaking out of his buried vault, the Ultimate goes on a rampage in Midwestern America, where he encounters the Justice League. He defeats the Justice League in a matter of minutes, which attracts the attention of Superman. Since the Ultimate could not introduce himself, Booster Gold calls him "Doomsday", which sticks. Five Leaguers, including Superman, combine their energy powers to create an assault capable of killing Doomsday, but he shields himself with the last of his burial cables, which are destroyed by the attack, allowing him to use both hands.

Doomsday's interest is captured by billboards and television spots directing people to wrestling competitions held in Metropolis, which leads the otherwise mindless creature to head towards the city. Superman finds that Doomsday's power was more than a match for his own and getting stronger. Though in the original story Doomsday shows no interest in Superman, ignoring him whenever possible, it was retconned in the Hunter/Prey miniseries that Doomsday developed a strong desire to murder Superman and other Kryptonians. Doomsday and Superman ultimately beat each other to death in front of the Daily Planet building in Metropolis.

Following the battle, four super-beings - Superboy, Cyborg Superman, Eradicator, and Steel - take up Superman's mantle, two of them declaring themselves to be the real Superman. Cyborg Superman straps Doomsday's body to an asteroid with an electronic device attached and flings him into deep space on a trajectory that will not pass by any planet.

=== Rematch: Hunter/Prey ===
After passing through a wormhole, Doomsday's asteroid is found by a deep-space scavenger ship en route to Apokolips. Doomsday is fully rested and, after killing the crew of the salvage ship, lands on Apokolips. This was to be the setup for a final showdown between Doomsday and Superman, who had been uneasy about the possibility of Doomsday's resurrection. With the help of his Justice League contacts, Superman procures a Mother Box after DeSaad contacts Earth about a problem on Apokolips.

Unbeknownst to Superman, Doomsday had faced and beaten Darkseid in single combat despite being empowered by the Omega Effect, even after withstanding the full effect of Darkseid's beams, and is laying waste to Apokolips. Before Superman can deal with Doomsday, DeSaad opens a Boom Tube to Calaton and sends Doomsday through to what he believed was his defeat at the hands of the Radiant. Doomsday was able to adapt, however, and overcome any opponent because of the process by which he was created, so, although the Radiant had defeated him once, he would not be able to defeat him again. Likewise, even though Superman had killed Doomsday once before, he was unable to do so again. Superman battles Doomsday again with the help of the Mother Box, but fails to defeat him. Superman is forced to use one of Waverider's time travel devices to leave Doomsday stranded at the end of time, where Doomsday meets the one force he cannot overcome: entropy.

=== The Doomsday Wars ===
Prin Vnok, an underling of Brainiac, uses his technology to travel to the end of time, retrieve Doomsday, and combine his power with Brainiac's intellect. With Doomsday's strength of will too strong for Brainiac to permanently overwhelm him on his own, Brainiac uses a human host to genetically engineer a Doomsday clone without the mind of the original. Brainiac kidnaps Pete Ross and Lana Lang's newborn baby, feeling that the baby's still-malleable DNA would make him ideal for the plan. Superman thwarts Brainiac's plot by driving him out of Doomsday's body via the use of a telepathy-blocking "psi-blocker", simultaneously rescuing the baby from Brainiac. Superman lures Doomsday to the Moon, placing him in stasis with four Justice League teleporters. Perpetually transporting between the four booths, Doomsday would never be more than 25% integrated, and thus unable to escape.

=== Our Worlds at War ===
Doomsday is released by Manchester Black's Suicide Squad to battle Imperiex. Once freed, Doomsday slaughters the Squad before confronting Imperiex's probes. Doomsday, working alongside Superman, tears through numerous probes with little effort before finally confronting Imperiex. Imperiex proves too much for Doomsday, who is reduced to a skeleton.

=== Sentience ===
Doomsday's skeleton is retrieved and his flesh regrown by Lex Luthor using Superman's DNA. By this time, Doomsday has evolved sentience. Luthor arranges for the Joker to set Doomsday loose in Washington, D.C. amidst the anniversary of Superman's death. Despite being weakened by kryptonite exposure, Superman is resuscitated by Black Lightning and reaches Doomsday, who is battling Martian Manhunter. Superman knocks him out Doomsday, proving to himself and the world that Doomsday would never again be Superman's equal.

Darkseid attempts to replicate Doomsday, producing an army of Doomsday "clones". Darkseid is unable to completely duplicate Doomsday's power, but still uses the clones as foot soldiers, typically for diversions or intimidations. They are defeated by a combination of heat vision and Batman's batarangs during an attack on Paradise Island, while Darkseid kidnaps Supergirl.

When Superman travels to Apokolips to rescue Steel, Mortalla orders Apokolips's troops to release Doomsday to help Darkseid. Doomsday is defeated by Steel using the Entropy Aegis, an armor built from the remains of an Imperiex probe. Doomsday disappears and is seen wandering the harsh lands of Apokolips. However, with his newfound intelligence, Doomsday escapes Apokolips and returns to Earth. He assists Superman in battling Gog and is viewed as a hero in the future.

=== Reign of Doomsday ===
During the "Reign of Doomsday" storyline, Doomsday returns to carve a new path of destruction throughout the DC Universe. Doomsday captures Steel, Cyborg Superman, the Eradicator, Supergirl, and Superboy, before taking them to a cloaked satellite at the former location of New Krypton. Superman discovers that this was all part of a plot by Lex Luthor. After locating the satellite, Superman attempts to free his allies, only for them all to discover the apparently still-inert body of Doomsday, as well as three separate clones, each with a different power set.

Attempting to flee from the clones with Doomsday, the Superman Family discovers that their ship is on course for Earth with the potential to trigger an extinction-level event if it were to strike. Their attempt to divert the ship is interrupted by a being called "Doomslayer", who resembles a cyborg version of Doomsday and is later revealed to be a Doomsday clone. Doomslayer tears Eradicator apart and proclaimed that Earth must die for the future.

Doomslayer believes the original Doomsday to be an infection and plans to destroy Earth, considering it to be ground zero for Doomsday's "infection". Superman and his friends escape the ship with the original Doomsday and stop the ship from crashing onto Earth, pushing it into Metropolis's bay. Afterward, Doomslayer attacks the city with the Doomsday clones, determined to erase all trace and knowledge of Doomsday from existence.

Superman's allies use the original Doomsday's body to try to find a way to stop the Doomsday clones. Doomsday awakens under the control of Eradicator (who was thought to be killed by Doomslayer). Eradicator arrives and defends Superman, now very weak, from Doomslayer, allowing himself to be trapped with Doomslayer as they are teleported away.

=== The New 52 ===
Doomsday, as the character appeared on the cover of Batman/Superman #3.1: Doomsday (November 2013). Artwork cover by Tony Daniel, Sandu Florea and Tomeu Morey.

In The New 52 (a 2011 reboot of the DC Comics universe), Doomsday made his official debut in September 2013 as a part of "Villains Month". In Batman/Superman #3.1, Doomsday attacked Krypton many years ago when Lara was a lieutenant in the Kryptonian military. Colonel Zod faced him wearing an ancient armor of Krypton's warrior founders but their battle caused the death of thousands of Kryptonians. Zod apparently defeated Doomsday, sending him to the Phantom Zone. Years later, Zod, now also imprisoned in the Phantom Zone, communicated with the young Kara Zor-El, telling her how he admired the creature because it destroyed everything, an attribute he sought for his people to be strong as years of complacency had made the Kryptonians weak. Zor-El narrated a prophecy in which the last knight of the House of El will travel to a distant planet after the destruction of Krypton. The last knight will be found by Doomsday later and will battle him to save his people, sacrificing his own life to do so.

In Superman/Wonder Woman, Doomsday mysteriously appears in the North Atlantic Ocean and fights Wonder Woman, breaking her arm before vanishing. After describing her attacker to Superman, both travel to the Fortress of Solitude, where Diana identifies Doomsday on a Phantom Zone viewing device. Superman assumes that the walls of the Phantom Zone are failing, which has allowed the momentary escapes for Doomsday.

Doomsday escapes the Phantom Zone to wreak havoc across the globe, changing into an even deadlier form; now, every living thing in its vicinity dies, and even physical structures crumble. Superman, Wonder Woman, Steel, and the Justice League struggle to defeat it, even calling on the aid of Lex Luthor; in the end, Superman drags Doomsday's body to Venus and incinerates it. Believing Doomsday dead, Superman returns to Earth, only to watch in horror as the creature teleports there. Finally realizing he has no choice, Superman kills Doomsday, slicing him in half and inhaling its remains to contain them. However, Superman starts to change physically and mentally, resembling Doomsday. It is revealed that Doomsday was released by the Phantom King (Xa-Du), on instigation of Brainiac; the latter orchestrated it to get rid of Superman as he prepared to assimilate the consciousnesses of all human beings in the world. Superman attacks Brainiac's ship and drags it into a black hole, ridding himself of the Doomsday infection in the process.

=== DC Rebirth ===
In 2016, DC Comics implemented a relaunch of its books called "DC Rebirth", which restored its continuity to a form much as it was prior to "The New 52". After the death of the New 52 Superman, the pre-Flashpoint Superman appears to confront Lex Luthor as he attempts to proclaim his new role as Metropolis's protector in the absence of Superman. However, their fight is interrupted when Doomsday emerges from a coffin that was being transported by an unidentified group in a hovercar above them. As Superman and Luthor attempt to fight the creature, Superman is troubled to realize that this Doomsday operates at a strength level similar to the creature he faced for the first time in his world, but also has some degree of strategic planning, attacking passing trains and civilians to distract Superman and Luthor. As Wonder Woman appears to assist, Doomsday departs, but Superman and Wonder Woman are able to intercept him before he reaches Superman's wife, Lois, and their son Jon. While Wonder Woman takes Lois and Jon to the Justice League Watchtower for safety, Superman is confused when an unknown group appears and attacks Doomsday, but they are swiftly defeated. He subsequently manages to lure Doomsday to his own makeshift Fortress. Lois and Jon plea to Wonder Woman to help Clark when he struggles in containing him and she soon joins the battle again. This allows Clark time to use the Phantom Zone projector to trap his foe, but he is unaware that the unknown group led by Mr. Oz intercepted the Phantom Zone beam and have captured Doomsday for their own unknown purposes.

After the merging of the timelines of both pre and post-Flashpoint Superman in "Superman Reborn", Doomsday had become smarter and escaped from his confinement when Tim Drake, who had also been imprisoned by Mr. Oz, opened all the cells to escape. Tim Drake from the "Titans Tomorrow" timeline, who had also been imprisoned there, came to his rescue and stunned Doomsday several times with Kryptonite ammunition. Unable to take him down, he tricks him into re-entering his cell by chasing a hologram of Superman.

== Powers and abilities ==
Doomsday was developed in one of the harshest habitats in all of existence: prehistoric Krypton. Through cloning technology, the infant continually returned to life and evolved, becoming resistant or immune to whatever killed him before, ultimately permanently acquiring the capability to regenerate and evolve without technology. After the Radiant killed him the first time they fought, Doomsday grew immune to the Radiant's energy-projection and even managed to withstand Darkseid's full Omega-Effect. The amount of damage dealt to Doomsday determined the length of time it took for him to fully recover. During his outwardly undamaged death at Superman's hands, he only needed some days to recover, but when Imperiex reduced him to a skeleton, it took months. His entombment in a Calatonian burial suit and metal vault lasted hundreds of millennia. After being killed by the Radiant and subsequently undergoing the impact of the casket on Earth, his body was sealed underground in total darkness, depriving him of solar energy and greatly slowing his resurrection.

Doomsday possesses immense strength and durability, surpassing that of Superman. As a result of his engineering, Doomsday does not need to eat, drink, breathe, or sleep to survive. His body is almost solid mass with no internal organs, with the masses of bone-like material covering his body acting as protection and as weapons.

After being regrown by Lex Luthor, Doomsday was enhanced with Superman's DNA. However, he displayed no additional abilities and developed Superman's vulnerability to kryptonite. Unlike Superman, Doomsday's vulnerability to kryptonite is not fatal to him.

=== Other powers ===
During his confrontation with Steel, Doomsday spontaneously developed the power of flight, and the ability to cover his body with metallic armor, capable of resisting even Steel's paralyzing nanites. In a later confrontation with the Outsiders, as he sought to confront the Eradicator, he demonstrated the ability to absorb energy from Looker and Halo's attacks and send it back to them in a massive burst manipulating raw power like the Eradicator. During his battle with the Cyborg-Superman, the Cyborg tore through portions of Doomsday's body, which were quickly replaced with bionic parts of his own, giving itself vast technopathy.

In the DCU revamp, Doomsday was revealed to grow and evolve in stages since its genesis. Growing as well as gaining in biomass and power over the course of its own development cycle, it was soon revealed that when it killed Superman post-reboot, it was only in its larval stage. While undergoing its adolescence phase, the monster created a giant clump of its own biomass as a makeshift cocoon, which steadily built up its physiological structure to its current state by feeding on the natural wildlife around it. Doomsday's strength allows him to breach the space between dimensions, giving him access to the Phantom Zone.

== Other versions ==
=== Devastator ===
The Devastator, an amalgamation of Doomsday and Batman from Earth -1, appears in Dark Nights: Metal and Dark Nights: Death Metal. This version formerly operated as Batman before transforming into Doomsday to defeat his universe's version of Superman, retaining his mind and being able to return to human form at will.

=== Doombreaker ===
In Infinite Frontier, it was revealed that construction worker Lloyd Crayton witnessed Superman's first fight with Doomsday. He later obtains one of Doomsday's bones, transforming him into a four-armed monster resembling him called Doombreaker. Superman uses his heat vision on the bone fragment, returning Crayton to his normal form.

Crayton is placed in the custody of S.T.A.R. Labs. When Jon Kent takes the Doomsday bone fragment across the United States, Lloyd wakes up and starts tracking it. Closing in on it, Crayton transforms into Doombreaker again and battles Superman until he is teleported off Earth.

=== Time Trapper ===
A future version of Doomsday became the Time Trapper, a powerful entity who controls time. In the storyline "DC K.O.", Time Trapper learns that he was created to destroy Darkseid and ultimately sacrifices himself to empower Superman with his energy, allowing him to combat Darkseid.

== In other media ==
=== Television ===
==== Live-action ====
- Doomsday appears in the eighth season of Smallville, portrayed by Dario Delacio. This version was created on Krypton via its strongest creatures' DNA to serve as Major Zod and Faora's "son" and kill Kal-El. Its genetic material became attached to the young Kal-El's spaceship and traveled to Earth, where it befriended Lex Luthor and was given up for adoption in 1989. Receiving the name "Davis Bloome" (portrayed by Sam Witwer), he went on to become a paramedic and fall in love with Chloe Sullivan before recognizing Clark Kent as Kal-El, which causes him to periodically transform into Doomsday. Throughout the season, Bloome struggles to maintain control over Doomsday before Sullivan uses black kryptonite to separate them and Kent traps Doomsday underground. Following this, Bloome and Jimmy Olsen fight over their shared love of Sullivan before mortally wounding each other. Witwer was offered the chance to return in the ninth season as Zod, but ultimately declined as he felt it would be difficult for both the characters and audience to accept.
- Doomsday appears in Krypton. This version was originally Dax-Baron (portrayed by Staz Nair), a Kandorian with a unique genetic mutation who was convinced he would be the one to end a Kryptonian civil war and allowed Kryptonian scientists Wedna-El and Van-Zod to experiment on him until he became Doomsday. He was subsequently put into cryo-stasis, but is eventually freed in the present by Seg-El, who seeks his power to stop Brainiac despite Adam Strange's protests. Zod eventually captures Doomsday to weaponize him in his campaign to colonize other planets before sending him to Krypton's moon Wegthor to defeat a rebellion against him. After Wegthor is destroyed, Doomsday is presumed dead before being found in a frozen meteorite.
- Doomsday appears in Superman & Lois, initially portrayed by Tyler Hoechlin and later motion-captured by Paul Lazenby. This version was originally Kal-El / Bizarro, a corrupted version of Superman from an inverted universe who was killed by Mitch Anderson before being resurrected by Bruno Mannheim, experimented on by Lex Luthor, which turns him into Doomsday. Throughout the third and fourth seasons, Doomsday serves as Luthor's enforcer until Lois Lane reminds the former of his time as Bizarro. Nonetheless, Luthor mutates Doomsday further, diminishing the latter's mental capacity, before Steel incapacitates the monster and Superman flies him into the sun. Though Bizarro's memories return, he allows Superman to kill him.

==== Animation ====
- Doomsday appears in series set in the DC Animated Universe (DCAU), voiced by Michael Jai White. This version is an altered clone of Superman who was created by Project Cadmus to serve as the former's superior and indoctrinated with hatred for him.
  - Doomsday was considered to appear in Superman: The Animated Series, but writer Paul Dini refused to include him.
  - Doomsday appears in the Justice League two-part episode "A Better World". When he grew too difficult to control, Cadmus abandoned the project and launched Doomsday into space, but he damaged the rocket before leaving Earth's orbit and crash-landed. After returning to Earth, he battles the Justice Lords, who arrived from their native universe to conquer the main universe, until their version of Superman lobotomizes him.
  - In the Justice League Unlimited episode "The Doomsday Sanction", Doomsday regenerates his brain and is taken into Project Cadmus' custody until disgraced member Achilles Milo releases him to kill his superior Amanda Waller. However, Doomsday kills Milo instead and escapes to fight Superman before being defeated. After failing to interrogate him for information on Cadmus, Superman imprisons Doomsday in the Phantom Zone.
- Doomsday makes a cameo appearance in the Legion of Super Heroes episode "Phantoms" as a prisoner of the Phantom Zone.
- Doomsday appears in the Teen Titans Go! episode "Doomsday Preppers", voiced by Asher Bishop. This version is childish and wants to befriend the Teen Titans.

=== Film ===
==== Live-action ====
- Doomsday appears in the DC Extended Universe (DCEU) film Batman v Superman: Dawn of Justice, voiced and motion-captured by Robin Atkin Downes, with Gary Hecker providing additional voice work. This version was created by Lex Luthor using his blood and the body of General Zod to recreate a monster detailed in the files of a crashed Kryptonian scout ship. It is ultimately defeated by Superman, Batman, and Wonder Woman, though Doomsday kills Superman in turn.
- Doomsday makes a cameo appearance in the DCEU film Zack Snyder's Justice League via a recap of the previous film shown at the beginning.

==== Animation ====
- Doomsday appears in Superman: Doomsday. This version is an improperly programmed biomechanical supersoldier and doomsday device that is incapable of distinguishing friend from foe, destroying everything in its path because it must. After being unearthed by LexCorp, Doomsday rampages throughout Metropolis before fighting and eventually being killed by Superman.
- An army of Doomsday clones appear in Superman/Batman: Apocalypse.
- Doomsday appears in the DC Animated Movie Universe (DCAMU) film The Death of Superman. This version is an Apokoliptian biological weapon created by Darkseid to kill Superman in preparation for an Apokoliptian invasion.
- In the DCAMU film Justice League Dark: Apokolips War, Darkseid combines Doomsday's DNA with that of Parademons to create an army of hybrid creatures called Paradooms.
- An illusion of Doomsday makes a cameo appearance in Injustice.
- A Yakuza-inspired alternate timeline incarnation of Doomsday called Deiō Dōmuzu appears in Batman Ninja vs. Yakuza League, voiced by Tesshō Genda in Japanese and English. He serves as a leading member of a Yakuza faction called the Hagane family before he is killed by Yakuza League member Kuraku, the Man of Steel.

=== Video games ===
- Doomsday appears as a boss in The Death and Return of Superman (1994).
- A Doomsday clone appears in Justice League Heroes, voiced by Charles Gideon Davis.
- Doomsday appears in DC Universe Online, voiced by Benjamin Jansen. Additionally, LexCorp conducted experiments on Smallville's citizens via Doomsday's DNA, turning them into Doomsday-like creatures, while a modernized Doomsday carrying a spore plague appears in a later update.
- Doomsday appears as a playable character in Injustice: Gods Among Us, voiced by Khary Payton.
- Doomsday appears as a boss and character summon in Scribblenauts Unmasked: A DC Comics Adventure.
- Doomsday appears as a playable character in Lego Batman 3: Beyond Gotham, voiced by Travis Willingham.
- Doomsday appears as a playable character in Infinite Crisis, voiced by Fred Tatasciore.
- Doomsday appears as a playable character in DC Unchained.
- Doomsday appears as an unlockable character in Lego DC Super-Villains, voiced again by Fred Tatasciore.

=== Miscellaneous ===
The Injustice incarnation of Doomsday appears in the Injustice: Gods Among Us prequel comic. The Joker infects Superman with Scarecrow's fear toxin, causing Superman to hallucinate a pregnant Lois Lane as Doomsday and fly her into outer space. When she died, a nuclear bomb that the Joker tied to her pulse detonated in Metropolis. Sometime later, Superman brings the real Doomsday under his control via a harness that limits his ability to act independently.

=== Merchandise ===
- Doomsday received a figure in the Justice League Unlimited tie-in toy line as part of a six-pack.
- Doomsday, based on his appearance in Superman: Doomsday, received a figure from Mattel.
- Doomsday, based on his appearance in Injustice: Gods Among Us, received a figure from DC Collectibles as part of a two-pack with Catwoman.
- Doomsday received a figure from DC Direct.
- Doomsday received a figure in Mattel's DC Super Heroes line.
- Doomsday, based on the DC Extended Universe incarnation, received a Mirage 3D figure from Soap Studio.

== See also ==
- List of Superman enemies
