= Clark Kent (Smallville) =

Fictional character from Smallville

- Smallville character
- Clark's costume in season ten reflects his outfit in the first eight seasons, but with a leather jacket and an additional embossed Superman shield.
- First appearance: "Pilot"; Smallville; October 16, 2001
- Last appearance: "Crisis on Infinite Earths, Part 2"; Batwoman; December 9, 2019
- Based on: Superman by: Jerry Siegel; Joe Shuster
- Adapted by: Alfred Gough; Miles Millar
- Portrayed by: Tom Welling; Malkolm Alburquenque (young); Jackson Warris (young); Brett Dier (alternate timeline)

In-universe information
- Full name: Kal-El (birth name); Clark Joseph Kent (adoptive name)
- Aliases: The Red-Blue Blur; The Blur; Superman
- Species: Kryptonian
- Affiliation: Justice League; Daily Planet
- Spouse: Lois Lane
- Significant other: Lana Lang (ex girlfriend)
- Relatives: Jor-El (biological father, deceased); Lara (biological mother, deceased); Jonathan Kent (adoptive father, deceased); Martha Kent (adoptive mother); Kara Kent (cousin); Conner Kent (partial genetic clone)
- Abilities: Invulnerability, superhuman strength, speed, sight, and hearing, super breath, heat vision, X-ray vision, and flight

Clark Joseph Kent, born Kal-El, is a fictional character and the main protagonist on The WB/The CW television series Smallville. The character of Clark Kent, first created for comic books by Jerry Siegel and Joe Shuster in 1938 as the civilian persona of DC Comics' Superman, was adapted to television in 2001 by Alfred Gough and Miles Millar. This is the fourth time the character has been adapted to a live-action television series. Clark was continually portrayed by Tom Welling during the series' ten seasons, with various other actors portraying Clark as a child. The character has also appeared in various literature based on the Smallville series, all of which are completely independent of the television episodes. As of 2011, Smallville's Clark Kent has appeared in eighteen young adult novels. Welling reprised the role in 2019 for the Arrowverse television crossover event "Crisis on Infinite Earths".

In the series, Clark attempts to live the life of a normal human being, and struggles with keeping the secret of his alien heritage from his friends. He has an on-again, off-again relationship with childhood friend Lana Lang through the first seven seasons, the trials of which are based on his lack of honesty about his secret, which eventually gives way to the traditional relationship with Daily Planet co-worker Lois Lane. In contrast to previous incarnations of the character, this Clark starts out best friends with Lex Luthor, whom he meets after saving the latter's life. The pair's friendship eventually deteriorates into hatred for one another. In Smallville, Clark's powers appear over time, as he is not aware of all of them at the start of the show; for instance, his heat vision and super breath do not develop until season two and six, respectively.

When developing Smallville's version of Clark, the producers decided to strip him down to the "bare essence" of Superman; he is also fallible, which allows the audience to see his humanity, but that he is also "... good to the core". In the series, he has been seen by critics, and intentionally portrayed by the filmmakers, as a symbolic representation of Jesus Christ. Welling has been nominated for multiple Teen Choice and Saturn Awards for his portrayal of Clark.

== Role in Smallville ==
Clark Kent first appears in the pilot episode of Smallville as a teen with superhuman abilities that he uses to help others. Clark is adopted by Jonathan and Martha Kent (John Schneider and Annette O'Toole) as a young child, when he crash lands on Earth on the day of the Smallville meteor shower in 1989. Twelve years later, trying to find his place in life after being told he is an alien by his adoptive father, Clark saves the life of Lex Luthor (Michael Rosenbaum), the son of billionaire Lionel Luthor (John Glover), and the pair become quick friends. During season one, Clark struggles with the burden of keeping his powers a secret from those close to him. In particular, he is afraid to open up to Lana Lang (Kristin Kreuk) for fear that she would not accept him if she learned of his extraterrestrial origins.

In the season two episode "Rosetta", Clark learns of his Kryptonian heritage, including his native language, his birth name (Kal-El), and his birth father's Jor-El (Terence Stamp) plan for him to rule the world. Fearful that he will not be able to control his own destiny, Clark runs away to Metropolis with a class ring made of red kryptonite that Chloe Sullivan (Allison Mack), his best friend, owned. In the season two finale, he leaves Lana behind, with whom he had started to develop a romantic relationship. In the season three premiere, three months later, Clark is living a criminal life in Metropolis, but he's eventually brought home by Jonathan, who has agreed to allow Jor-El to take Clark at an undetermined time in the future. In the season three finale, a girl calling herself Kara arrives at the Kent farm and claims to be from Krypton. After Kara predicts that Clark's friends are destined to leave or betray him, Clark decides to leave Smallville for good. When Jonathan attempts to intervene, Jor-El threatens to kill him. To save his adoptive father's life, Clark agrees to go through with his decision to leave.

In the season four premiere, Clark returns to Smallville. He has been "reprogrammed" by Jor-El to seek out the three stones of knowledge so he may fulfill his destiny. He meets Lois Lane (Erica Durance), who is investigating the supposed death of her cousin, and Clark's best friend, Chloe. Clark, with help from his mother, regains control over his mind and consciously refuses to look for the stones. In the season four finale, a "great evil" is awakened in space after Clark defies Jor-El's instructions and fails to obtain the three stones of knowledge. With a new meteor shower hitting Smallville, Clark finds the remaining stones and is transported to the Arctic, where the three stones create the Fortress of Solitude.

In the season five premiere, Clark interrupts his training to return to Smallville, but when he fails to return to the Fortress before the Sun sets, he is stripped of his powers. In the episode "Hidden", Clark begins an honest relationship with Lana, but is killed trying to save the town from a resident who hopes to kill all of the "... meteor freaks". Jor-El resurrects Clark, but warns him that someone he loves will eventually have to take his place. Clark worries about who will be sacrificed in return for him being saved. In the episode "Reckoning", Lana is killed. Unwilling to accept this, Clark turns back time to save her. As a result, it is Clark's adoptive father that becomes the sacrifice when he suffers a fatal heart attack. In the season five finale, Clark battles Brainiac (James Marsters), a Kryptonian artificial intelligence in the form of a man. Clark fights to stop Brainiac from releasing the Kryptonian criminal Zod from the Phantom Zone. Clark fails, and becomes himself imprisoned in the Phantom Zone, while Zod escapes and sets out to conquer Earth.

In the season six premiere, Clark escapes the Phantom Zone — inadvertently releasing several of the prisoners in the process — and returns to Smallville, where he fights and defeats Zod. The other Phantom Zone escapees become Clark's primary focus in season six. He must also deal with Lana's romantic relationship with Lex, which culminates in their engagement in the season six episode "Promise". The season six finale reveals that the last of the Phantom Zone criminals is really a genetic experiment created by Kryptonian scientists. The escapee attacks Clark, cloning his DNA, and becomes Clark's doppelgänger. In the season seven premiere, Clark, together with John Jones (Phil Morris), defeats his doppelgänger. As the season continues, Clark discovers that a secret society known as Veritas was aware of his landing in Smallville during the first meteor shower and, moreover, possess a device that supposedly allows them to control him. In the season seven finale, Clark is confronted by Lex at the Fortress of Solitude. Lex has discovered Clark's secret and possesses the Veritas device, which he uses, resulting in the Fortress collapsing on him and Clark.

In the season eight premiere, it is revealed that the Veritas device does not allow others to control Clark, but rather strips him of his powers. Wandering the globe with Russian gangsters, Clark is eventually found and rescued by Oliver Queen (Justin Hartley) and John Jones, with the latter restoring Clark's powers. During season eight, Clark uses his new job at the Daily Planet to access advance information, which he uses to stop crime around the city. In subsequent episodes, Clark adopts the name "Red-Blue Blur" as his superhero moniker. Toward the end of the season, Clark wrestles with the idea of having to kill Davis Bloome (Sam Witwer), a new friend, after discovering that Davis is actually Doomsday, a genetically engineered creature created by General Zod to kill Clark and destroy Earth. In the season eight finale, Clark finds a way to separate Davis' personality from that of Doomsday, and buries Doomsday underground. When Davis subsequently kills Jimmy Olsen (Aaron Ashmore), Clark decides that his human-learned emotions have caused him the most trouble, as it was his compassion for Davis that led to Jimmy's death. He vows that "Clark Kent is dead".

The start of season nine reveals that Clark has begun training with Jor-El, which is shown by his wearing his family crest on his chest when in his superhero persona. After realizing there are other Kryptonians on Earth, lacking special powers and led by Zod (Callum Blue), Clark decides to help them adjust to living as humans. When Zod is shot and killed, Clark uses his own blood to bring him back to life, resulting in Zod regaining his Kryptonian powers. Zod enables the other Kryptonians to regain their powers as well, and unites them to destroy the world in order to turn it into a new Krypton. This season, Lois and Clark begin a romantic relationship, while Lois also assists "The Blur" in his heroic endeavors. Clark kisses Lois while he is "the Blur" in the season nine finale and unknowingly reveals to her the truth. Afterward, he convinces the Kryptonians to leave Earth for a new, uninhabited planet. Clark then sacrifices his own life to send Zod through a portal, far away from Earth.

Season ten begins with Clark stuck in the afterlife, where Jor-El informs him that a great darkness is coming to Earth. Clark is unknowingly resurrected by Lois, who is now aware that he is "the Blur". Jor-El also informs Clark that he is not ready to be Earth's true savior, as there are inner demons that Clark must overcome first. In the episode "Homecoming", Clark is visited by Brainiac 5, who shows Clark how his past has shaped his present, and will one day shape his future; including a vision of Clark's future self when he has fully embraced his destiny. In the episode "Isis", Clark reveals his secret to Lois only to find out that she already knew he was "the Blur", which is followed in a later episode by Clark proposing to Lois. Clark realizes that in order to be the hero the world needs, he will have to step out of the shadows and into the light. As a result, Clark makes the decision to turn "Clark Kent" into a real disguise — opting to wear eyeglasses and alter his mannerisms to be more shy and reserved — so that the Blur does not have to hide his face to the world. By the series finale, the darkness, which is revealed to be Darkseid, arrives on Earth to enslave all of humanity. Clark realizes that his entire life has been one big trial by Jor-El; accepting his true destiny, the Blur saves Earth from Darkseid's coming Apokolips. The series ends by moving seven years into the future, where Clark and Lois are finally getting married, and Clark has embraced his new identity as "Superman".

"With 'Red Clark' he's completely aware of the consequences of his actions at the time, but he doesn't care! He doesn't care what happens to you, and he certainly doesn't care what happens to himself, because he probably realizes that nothing can happen to him. It's always fun to be that way, even in real life, because we're not allowed to be that way all too often".

— Tom Welling on the effect of red kryptonite on Clark.

Throughout the series, Clark gains and adjusts to new abilities, including X-ray vision in season one, heat vision in season two, and super hearing in season three. Clark unofficially flew in the season four premiere, when he was reprogrammed as "Kal-El" by his biological father, but upon regaining his memory he forgot how to use the ability. In season six, Clark gained his super breath. By the series finale, Clark learns to fly. Clark also discovers new vulnerabilities as the series progresses, including "green meteor rocks" or (kryptonite), which he learns can weaken and potentially kill him. Various other forms of kryptonite appeared as the show continued, each with a different effect. Red kryptonite removed Clark's inhibitions. Black kryptonite separated Clark's Kryptonian personality from his human self, creating two distinct physical forms, and blue kryptonite stripped him of all supernatural abilities as long as it was in contact with him. Subsequent seasons also revealed that Clark could be vulnerable to alien weapons and magic.

== Portrayal ==
In October 2000, producers Alfred Gough and Miles Millar began their search for the three lead roles, and had casting directors in ten different cities looking at actors. After months of scouting, Tom Welling was cast as Clark Kent. Zachary Levi initially auditioned to play Clark Kent, but was asked instead to audition for Lex Luthor, a role Levi did not get either. Jensen Ackles, the runner up for the role of Clark Kent, would go on to play Jason Teague as a season four regular. Besides Welling, four other actors have portrayed Clark as young boy/teenager: Malkolm Alburquenque portrayed a three-year-old Clark in the pilot, and season two episode "Lineage"; Brandon Fonseca played young Clark in the season five episode "Vengeance"; and in the season eight episode "Abyss", Jackson Warris would fill the role. In addition, in an alternate reality in the seventh season episode "Apocalypse", a teenaged Clark Kent was portrayed by Brett Dier.

The pilot director, David Nutter, was looking through pictures of actors and stumbled on Tom Welling's image. When he asked about Welling, the casting director said Welling's manager did not want him to do the role because it could hurt his feature film career. After a conversation with Welling's manager, Nutter got Welling to read the script for the pilot, which convinced him to do the part. Welling's initial fears were quelled after reading the script, when he realized that the show was not about Clark "... being a super hero ...," but more about the character attempting to live a normal life as a teenager.

When Tom Welling auditioned for the role he was not sure how to prepare. While waiting for his turn, he realized that the character is one thing above all else: "... a high school kid ...." To Welling, simply acting like he was a normal teenager, instead of like a super hero, was the perfect way to embody the character. Welling realized that by doing that, the special effects and other production elements would fill in the holes and perfect the character on screen. For one of his auditions, he read the graveyard scene with Kristin Kreuk (the first actor to be cast for the show), and the network thought they had "... great chemistry".

"Honestly, I don't really have too much time to worry about the future. It's almost a blessing in disguise, because in a sense Clark doesn't know what's going to happen [either]".

— Tom Welling on his lack of Superman knowledge.

Welling was generally unfamiliar with the Superman mythology, so much so that when an episode of Lois & Clark: The New Adventures of Superman aired on television, which featured Clark learning about his Kryptonian heritage, Welling immediately turned the show off. According to Welling, he wanted to learn about Clark's heritage simultaneously to Clark learning about it on Smallville. Welling believed that it was important for him to learn with the character, to help him be the Clark Kent envisioned by Al Gough and Miles Millar. The actor believed his lack of knowledge of the Superman mythology helped his performance, because Gough and Millar set up the series so that the previous mythology was not as important. Welling also enjoyed that he was in the same predicament as Clark with neither knowing the future of the character, beyond the fact that he will be Superman. When Welling landed the role of Clark Kent he was sent various Superman-related gifts, including books and toys, which Welling planned to leave unopened until the show was over. Welling was adamant from the beginning that he had not signed on to play Superman, but rather Clark Kent on his journey to becoming Superman, and as such had no intention of wearing the costume. When asked about the decision to not wear the suit in the series finale, Welling commented: "We jumped onto this idea that at the end of the show, the idea is that Clark becomes Superman and he's out there, and we know he's out there, but we can't go with him, but that we know and we feel good that he's out there doing good. That was what we strove for, and I think we hit it. I liked the ending of the series, because it's like, 'Yes, he did it!' I hope the audience didn't feel like we didn't show them something that they needed to see. I felt like we gave them the jumping off point for their imagination as to what could happen".

While filming, Welling was allowed input into how his character responded in certain situations, including moving the scene between rooms, or requesting the director film particular mannerisms to emphasize a specific emotion.

== Character development ==
=== Storyline progression ===
Early in the series, Clark was still learning how to handle his life, by learning to control his powers and find the best solution for everyone. His main priority was to fit in with his friends at school and be an average guy. Initially, Clark's biggest problem was that he could not share his secret with anyone he cared about. According to Welling: "He is burdened with a lot of responsibility. He hasn't been able to choose whether or not he has these abilities. All this responsibility has just been thrust on him, and he has to deal with it. There have got to be times when he goes home and thinks to himself, 'Why me?' He wishes it could all go away and he could just be normal. That's part of the character dilemma which makes him interesting to play". Welling noted that the show was not about Clark always saving the day, but more about how using his powers "... alienate[s] him from others". Welling reasoned that by the end of season three, Clark had decided that leaving Smallville and going with Jor-El was something that would save everyone a lot of pain in the long run. Welling described why Clark finally gave in to Jor-El at the end of season three:

"If you can't fight them, you might as well join them [...] he was choosing the lesser of two evils to go with Jor-El. I think a combination of those two things would probably sum it up. A lot of times in your life, you get to a point where you go, 'I just can't fight this anymore. There's nothing I can do about it, so I better get up out of bed and go to work!' And in a sense, that's what Clark had to do. Somehow he had to try to face what it was that was causing him so much pain—and everyone else so much pain—and maybe he reasoned that by causing everyone else a little bit of pain, he could save them a lot of pain in the long run".

A significant moment in the character's story came when Clark decided to play football in season four, providing conflict between him and his father. Writer Darren Swimmer refers to this moment as a "... callback to [Hothead] ..." in season one. To him, when Clark defies Jonathan and joins the team anyway, it signified the moment where Jonathan finally decided that he can trust Clark to not hurt anyone. Writer Todd Slavkin viewed it as Clark finally emerging from his father's shadow. Two more significant moments came during the following season. First, Clark lost his powers when he failed to return to Jor-El to finish his training, leaving him human and vulnerable. According to Welling, "... [Clark] learned a little bit more about what it's like to be human, physically. Emotionally, he's pretty close to trying to understand that. It added more weight to his abilities once he got them back, and it made him realize his responsibilities for what he has". The second moment came in the show's 100th episode, with the death of Clark's adoptive father. The decision to kill Jonathan was made so that Clark could finally step into his destiny, allowing Clark the boy to become Clark the man, as explained by Gough. In order to do that he needed his mentor to die, so that no one would buffer him from the world any longer. Welling saw the series' 100th episode as the chance for his character to evolve and grow. John Schneider saw the same catalyst for Clark's evolution. According to Schneider, Jonathan's death inspired Clark to make the move toward his eventual destiny. Jonathan provided such an example of sacrifice that it leaves a void in Clark. To fill that void Clark would have to become Superman. It was Schneider's contention that had Jonathan not been the man he was, when the time came that the world needed Superman, Clark would have been unable to take on that persona, because he would not realize that the world needed him.

Writer Holly Harold noted that the introduction of Green Arrow (Justin Hartley) allowed Clark to mature more in the sixth season. Clark was able to see how others achieved the same goals, but used alternative routes that perhaps crossed moral lines. This taught Clark to start thinking about things from his opponents' perspectives. Ultimately, in season six Clark learned it would be his human side that allowed him to become the hero he needed to be, summed up by writer Turi Meyer as "... soon-to-be Man of Steel". Each season, Clark gained insight into how not to misuse his abilities from the kryptonite-mutated villains that used them for crime. In later seasons, Clark saw how even those that used their abilities for good might still have questionable actions, specifically Arthur Curry (Alan Ritchson) and Andrea Rojas (Denise Quiñones), though Clark did help them take the high road. Those episodes reiterated the effect Clark's parents had on how he used his abilities. Clark also learned that he cannot do everything alone, even though he chose not to join Oliver's team of superheroes at the end of the episode "Justice". For Meyer, season six showed that Clark was still struggling to accept his destiny, but did take steps toward the day that he would put on the cape and become Superman.

=== Characterization ===
The idea Gough and Millar came up with for their show's version of Clark Kent was to strip him down to his "... bare essence ...", discovering the reasons why Clark became Superman. In Smallville, Clark is fallible, as Gough explains:

The thing that we've tried to portray...is that Clark doesn't always make the right decisions, and by not making the right decisions, he brings further consequences on himself. Whether it's running away from Jor-El at the end of season two, or choosing humanity over some sort of Kryptonian mission, those decisions get him in more trouble, and cause more people to suffer, or in Jonathan Kent's case, to die.

Welling agreed with Gough's opinion of Clark's fallibility, stating that the mistakes Clark made showed his humanity.

The imagery used in the pilot episode, where Clark is strung to a scarecrow pole, drew early comparisons to Jesus Christ and his crucifixion.

Even though Clark could make the wrong choices, season five's "Aqua" helped illustrate the concept that Clark was "... good to the core". The episode showed how protective he could be over someone, even when that person annoyed him. In this case, he was trying to warn Lois that Arthur Curry may not have been the man she believed him to be. This concept was echoed by the Seattle Times' Julia Waterhous, who noted that Clark, despite all his flaws, always put others before himself. Welling's fellow actors also had their own insights into the character. Kristin Kreuk saw Clark as a kindred spirit who was sad, lonely, but also endearing, whereas John Schneider classified Clark as a special needs child.

Just like his comic book counterpart, Smallville's Clark Kent was a symbolic representation of Jesus Christ. Established early on, the pilot episode contained a moment when Clark was crucified on a scarecrow post during a high school hazing. The Pittsburgh Post-Gazette's Rob Owen noted the Christ-like imagery of the scene, stating, "Is it any wonder Clark gets tied up there since Superman, too, was 'sent to save us'?" Echoing Owen, Judge Byun identified the same symbolism: "Superman is, in a way, the secular pop culture stand-in for Jesus Christ, a messiah figure for our generation. The series makes this theme explicit in its pilot episode, in which Clark is symbolically 'crucified' in a cornfield. That striking bit of symbolism becomes the central preoccupation of the series; Clark is the savior who sacrifices all for the greater good of humanity, and Smallville shows us how he comes to accept and embrace that role".

This was extended to the end of season nine, where Clark sacrificed himself to send General Zod and the rest of the Kandorians to their own world. In doing so, Clark fell off a building "... in full crucifixion pose, driving home the point that he is sacrificing himself for the good of the planet". To this point, Cinefantastique's Tom Powers suggested that these images and metaphorical emphasis through dialogue exchanges came across so heavy-handed that a very devout individual might have found them offensive.

In addition to religious allusions, the crew used color schemes and camera movements to create their own themes for the characters. Since the show was told from Clark's point of view, particular visual elements were utilized to illustrate a particular characteristic. When he was safe at home the colors used to illustrate the environment were warm and gentle, with an earth tone, while the camera movement was gentle as well. When Clark was keeping his secret, but there was no danger around, the lighting was more neutral, with greater camera movement. When there was danger, the lighting became colder with more grays and blues, and the camera shifted to a handheld, allowing more extreme angles.

=== Relationships ===
Clark's relationships with the other characters evolved over the course of the show. Clark's relationship with Lex Luthor was symbolic, as the two shared a yin and yang type of relationship. In the pilot, Clark first saved Lex from drowning after a car accident; at the end of the episode, Lex saved Clark when he was strung up in the cornfield and immobilized by kryptonite. His relationship with Lex was tested by his lack of honesty, just like it was with Lana for the first six seasons; the same could be said for Lex's dishonesty with Clark. Both characters wanted to be completely honest with each other, but knew they could not, which inhibited their friendship.

His relationship with Lana Lang was one of Smallville's central relationships. When Clark and Lana met in the cemetery, Clark realized that he had found someone who understood him, who he could talk to, even though it was not in as strong a way as he would have liked. Although Clark felt close to Lana, his fear that she would "... kick him out of her life ..." if she learned his secret — that he came in the meteor shower that killed her parents — was strong enough to keep him from becoming as close to her as he wished. The lack of honesty caused issues between them. Judge Byun wondered how this Clark Kent would have room in his heart for Lois Lane later in life, as he had bounced back and forth between Lana and Chloe in the first season.

With Lana's boyfriend gone by season two, the door opened for Clark, but Welling stated he understood why the producers continued to keep Clark and Lana apart, even after Whitney's departure: "There's the cliché that television shows with a main love interest fail once they get it together". After briefly being together at the beginning of the fifth season, Clark's upbringing was not enough to help him cope with the loss of Lana to Lex toward the end of season five. Welling admits that Clark had learned to let Lana make her own choices and not stand in her way, but his problem with her relationship with Lex was that Lex is a dangerous individual and it put Lana's safety in jeopardy. Apart from that, Clark had learned to walk the lonely road of a hero. His inability to cope with Lana moving on with Lex was carried over to season six. This season was the time the writers put Clark through an emotional wringer when they had Lana accept Lex's marriage proposal. For writer Kelly Souders, this presented Clark's worst fear: the woman he loved was marrying his worst enemy.

Apart from Lana, Clark had a growing relationship with Lois. Season five saw the melting of the ice between the two characters, who continued to butt heads. Executive producer Darren Swimmer believed that the audience could finally start to see a growing attraction between the two, and the fact that both would be there for the other in a time of need. Erica Durance believed that Lois in season five, because of her self-imposed walls, laughed off any notion that she had a romantic interest in Clark, even if that notion was true. In season six, Durance described the relationship between Lois and Clark as something neither character wanted to put an official label on. Instead, Durance believed that, by that point in the series, Clark and Lois were satisfied with identifying with a "brother and sister friendship" label, rather than trying to discover how each truly feels. By season eight, Durance noted that Lois was starting to accept the idea that she may be in love with Clark more than she had been with anyone else in her life. His relationship with Lois was included in TV Guide's list of the best TV couples of all time.

=== Costume ===
In season nine, Clark began wearing a black costume while fighting crime in Metropolis.

For most of the series, Clark did not wear any sort of costume when in his superhero persona. From seasons one through eight, Clark was typically dressed in either red, yellow and blue (the traditional colors of the Superman costume), or in the All-American colors of red, white, and blue. This included the primary usage of either a blue T-shirt underneath a red jacket, or a red T-shirt worn under a blue jacket. In season nine, the producers decided to design an actual costume for Clark to wear while patrolling the streets of Metropolis. Abandoning the theme of red, blue, and yellow, the producers chose to keep the costume completely black, save for a silver Superman "S" shield painted on the front. Instead of the traditional cape, Clark's red jacket is traded for a black trenchcoat. This drew comparison to the character of Neo from The Matrix film series. It was also compared to the black suit Superman wore after being resurrected, following his death at the hands of Doomsday in the comic books.

In the season ten premiere, the audience got its first glimpse of the traditional Superman costume, which was left for Clark by Martha in the season nine finale. Although the suit was briefly seen through a reflection in Clark's eyes in the season nine finale, the suit that appeared in the season ten premiere was a different design. The producers, working alongside Warner Bros. and DC Comics, procured the costume worn by Brandon Routh in Superman Returns, which the team chose over the Christopher Reeve suit of the 1980s. DC Comics offered the suit worn by Reeve, but Peterson explained that it "... just didn't quite fit with our world". According to producer Kelly Souders: "The process was really a group effort. We worked with DC, and we have Alicia Louis, who does a lot of stuff for us at the studio, and who was really instrumental. It took quite a bit to get that costume. There's a lot of sign-offs, it really was Warner Bros. and DC and us working to make it happen". Peterson stated that the costume plays a more prominent role in the final season, with the last scene of Smallville ending with Clark wearing it. Before then, Clark began wearing a new costume in the season ten episode "Shield". Here, Clark replaced the black trenchcoat with a red leather jacket, and the "S" shield now embossed onto the chest of that jacket.

== Reception ==
In 2002, Welling was nominated for his first Saturn Award for Best Actor in a Television series, for his portrayal of Clark Kent in Smallville. Following that, Welling was nominated another four consecutive years, 2003 to 2006, for the Saturn Award for Best Actor in a Television series. The same year he was nominated for his first Saturn Award, Welling won a Teen Choice Award for Choice Breakout TV Star, Male. Although he has not won a Teen Choice Award since, just like with the Saturn Awards, he has been nominated for Choice Actor in television for the four consecutive years after his win, 2003 to 2006, Although not nominated in 2007, he did receive a nomination in 2008 and 2009 for Choice Male in an Action/Adventure series. Welling was also nominated for the 2006 Teen Choice Awards for Most Beautiful Couple (TV — Choice Chemistry), with his co-star Kristin Kreuk. In the 2009 Teen Choice Awards, Tom Welling received the award for Choice TV Actor — Action Adventure. Welling was included in TV Guide's list of "TV's Sexiest Crime Fighters".

Bryan Byun, of DVD Verdict, believes that Welling was the perfect choice for Clark Kent: "I can't imagine a more ideal actor to play this superpowered farm boy than Tom Welling, with his wholesome, honest face and heroic good looks—Welling not only resembles Christopher Reeve physically, but has all of the earnest charm that made Reeve the quintessential Superman". The Free Lance–Star's Ron Hedelt likened Welling's performances as Clark Kent to that of Christopher Reeve's performances in the Superman films, stating that Welling manages to portray a "... sweet, unassuming teenager ..." while showing Clark struggle with the truth about himself. Comics2Film's Rob Worley also wrote of the physical resemblance Welling has to Christopher Reeve, noting that the actor gave the character depth with his convincing portrayal of Clark's longing to fit in. When comparing Smallville's Clark Kent to Bryan Singer's Superman (Brandon Routh) in Superman Returns, Seattle Times' Julia Waterhous found Smallville's Clark Kent to be the more intriguing character. Waterhous explained that this was due to the inner turmoil of Clark — not being able to tell those he loved his secret — and the fact that no matter what his faults were he continued to put others before himself, remaining "... pure and good ...". She explained that this allowed the audience to become intimate with the character, something lacking in the film version. According to the Associated Press, Welling's popularity as Clark Kent on Smallville had fans of the show wishing he would take the role Routh received in Superman Returns.

== Other media appearances ==
=== Young adult novels ===
Smallville's Clark Kent has also appeared in two series of young adult novels. The first was published by Aspect publishing, consisting of eight novels, which began in October 2002 and ended in March 2004. The second series was published by Little, Brown Young Readers, also beginning in October 2002, with a total of ten young adult novels published through April 2004.

In Aspect's first novel, Smallville: Strange Visitors, written by Roger Stern, Clark attempted to stop two religious con-men from robbing the town with their kryptonite-enhanced spiritual seminars. Little's first novel, Arrival, chronicled the events of the show's pilot as written by author Michael Teitelbaum, and their second book, See No Evil, also published in October 2002 and was written by Cherie Bennett and Jeff Gottesfeld — who have also written episodes of the show — featured Clark trying to stop Dawn Mills, a young actress, from hurting people who speak badly about her, by using her power to turn invisible.

On November 1, 2002, Aspect published Alan Grant's book, Smallville: Dragon, which had Clark being hypnotized into believing that he was a normal, human teenager, with no abilities. Little's Flight featured Clark trying to lend emotional support to a young girl who has full-sized wings. The next Aspect novel, Hauntings, followed Clark and his friends as they investigate a ghostly presence in one of Smallville's haunted houses. Animal Rage followed Clark as he tries to stop an animal rights activist when she tries to hurt the people harming animals in Smallville. Aspect brought in Dean Wesley Smith for their next novel, Whodunit, which involved Clark, Chloe, Lana and Pete investigating the murder of a boy and his sister.

Little published their next two books in April and June 2003. The first, Speed, had Clark fighting hate crimes in Smallville. The second, Buried Secrets, followed Clark and Lex as they both fell in love with a mind-reading, substitute Spanish teacher. In the novel, Clark and Lex's friendship was put in jeopardy as the two competed for the teacher's love. On September 9, 2004, Aspect published Shadows, where Clark must stop a girl's scientist father, who has created a monster that is killing people. Runaway featured Clark leaving Smallville and living on the streets of Metropolis with other homeless teenagers. Clark fell in love with one of the girls before eventually returning home. Smallville: Silence has Clark and his friends investigating the appearance of zombies. Little's Greed followed Clark and his friends as they took jobs as summer counselors to disadvantaged youths. Pete tried to abuse Clark's abilities by tricking him into playing in a basketball game, and then betting on the outcome.

Alan Grant returned for a second outing to write Curse, about a grave digger who unleashed a 150-year-old curse onto Smallville, and Clark's attempt to put everything back the way it was. In Temptation, Clark used red kryptonite to try and impress Lana and Chloe after they become infatuated with a new, French foreign exchange student. Aspect released their final novel on March 1, 2004; written by Devin K. Grayson, City chronicled Clark and Lex's trip to Metropolis. While in the city, the pair got caught between the Japanese mafia and a secret agent who believed he has found an alien. In Little, Brown Young Readers' final novel, written by Cherie Bennett and Jeff Gottesfeld, Sparks featured Clark trying to save Chloe after she was exposed to a kryptonite fireworks display that makes her the desire of every man. For one of the men, when the desire wears off he decides that he really does want Chloe and kidnaps her.

=== Comic books ===
In 2012, the series was continued in Smallville: Season 11, a comic book available both in digital and print formats. Every Friday for three weeks in a row, the stories which follow the primary story arcs, were released online and were referred to as episodes. The following week, the preceding three episodes were released as a print comic. Parallel to the main story arc, other story arcs featuring other characters (many of which were part of the future "Justice League America") were released online every fourth Friday, and collected and printed in special editions by themselves, separate from the main story. Written by Bryan Q. Miller, who wrote for the television series, the comic took up the story of the Smallville characters six months after The Blur saved Earth from the Apokolips. Clark no longer fights crime by the alias The Blur, but has been dubbed Superman by the masses.

During the season Clark continued his battles with Lex Luthor, who had lost his memory. New characters were introduced, such as Commander Hank Henshaw, a participant in LexCorp's project, Guardian Defense Platforms. In the third issue, Clark, as Superman, confronted Lex, during which Clark inadvertently implied that he knew Lex before his amnesia. Superman and Batman met and battled, but declared a truce, and began working together, eventually becoming friends. Clark also reunited with Bart Allen, who was seeking Clark's aid in battling the Black Flash, who kills Bart during an ensuing battle.

At one point, Clark and Michael Jon Carter (Booster Gold) inadvertently traveled to the 31st century, where they found themselves caught in a war between New Krypton, led by Kara, and an army of xenophobes, during which Doomsday is reawakened, then defeated when all the belligerents form an alliance. While in the future, Clark met a child named Bartholomew Allen, causing Clark to suspect he was a descendant of Bart and giving him hope that he was still alive. After meeting Diana Prince, with whom he teamed to defeat Hades and Felix Faust, Clark, as Superman, chose to reveal to the President that he was not a meteor-infected individual as the public believed but was from another planet. Later, Clark attempted to rally the heroes and the world to make a stand against the Monitors. After Oliver and Chloe's son Jonathan is born, they named Clark and Lois as the child's godparents.

=== Arrowverse ===
Tom Welling reprised his role as Clark Kent in the 2019 Arrowverse crossover "Crisis on Infinite Earths". During the crossover, he is confronted by Earth-38's Lex Luthor, who sought to use the "Book of Destiny" to kill Supermen across the multiverse, but Lex fails to subdue this version of Clark with kryptonite as the latter reveals he had long since given up his heroics and powers so he could spend time with his wife Lois and their daughters. Though Lex attempts to fight him, Clark easily defeats him, prompting the former to leave and proceed with his Superman-killing spree.

While discussing the Smallville episode "Persona" in 2025, Welling provided some context to Clark's powerless state in the crossover. According to him, Clark was using Blue Kryptonite, like Dax-Ur in "Persona". Within the context of Smallville, Blue Kryptonite strips a Kryptonian of their powers as long as they are exposed to it. In "Persona", Dax-Ur wore a piece of Blue Kryptonite in a bracelet. If the bracelet was removed, his powers would instantly return. In the Smallville episode "Hereafter", Jordan Cross has a vision of Clark, in a distant future, as Superman. He then describes Clark as not having an ending, but going on forever.

== Merchandise ==
DC Direct has released action figures for Clark Kent, along with other Smallville characters. The first set of action figures was released on October 2, 2002, and was modeled after Clark's appearance in the first season. The second series was released on May 7, 2008, and was designed after Clark's appearance in the season six episode "Justice".
