= Smallville season 9 =

Season of television series

Smallville
- Season 9
- DVD and Blu-ray cover featuring star Tom Welling
- Showrunners: Brian Peterson; Kelly Souders
- Starring: Tom Welling; Allison Mack; Erica Durance; Cassidy Freeman; Callum Blue; Justin Hartley
- No. of episodes: 21

Release
- Original network: The CW
- Original release: September 25, 2009 – May 14, 2010

Season chronology
- ← Previous; Season 8 Next → Season 10

The ninth season of Smallville, an American television series developed by Alfred Gough and Miles Millar, began airing on September 25, 2009 on The CW. The series recounts the early adventures of Kryptonian Clark Kent as he adjusts to life in the fictional town of Smallville, Kansas, during the years before he becomes Superman. The ninth season comprises 21 episodes and concluded its initial airing on May 14, 2010. After four seasons broadcasting on Thursday nights at 8:00 pm, Smallville was moved to Friday nights at 8:00 pm for season nine, to make room for The Vampire Diaries. Regular cast members during season nine include Tom Welling, Allison Mack, Erica Durance, Cassidy Freeman, Callum Blue, and Justin Hartley.

In this season, Clark (Welling) takes his superhero persona into obsessive territory when he leaves behind those he cares for so that he can focus solely on Jor-El's training. In order to accomplish this, Clark wears a new costume that sports his family crest on the chest. The theme of the season is about Clark finally embracing his alien heritage, while also being his darkest hour thus far. As a result, Clark's relationships with Chloe Sullivan (Mack) and Oliver Queen (Hartley) suffer. Season nine also introduces more DC Comics characters, including multiple episode appearances for the Justice Society of America (JSA), as well as villain Metallo, government agent Amanda Waller, the Wonder Twins, and a variation on the lost citizens of Kandor.

Following the end of season eight, Aaron Ashmore and Sam Witwer departed the series after both their characters were killed off. With the loss of two series regulars, producers had to look for a new primary villain for season nine. Executive producers Kelly Souders and Brian Peterson decided to use Zod, a character from the comics and the Superman film series, portrayed by Blue. This version of Zod is younger than previous incarnations, including the short appearance he had on Smallville in season six, and goes by the title of "Major Zod". Original depictions list the character as "General Zod".

The season premiere brought in 2.58 million viewers and outperformed any other show in the Friday 8:00 pm timeslot in over a year. Furthermore, "Absolute Justice", a double-length episode featuring the JSA, aired on February 5, 2010. In an effort to clear up confusion, the Smallville writers announced on their Twitter page that they still consider it to be two separately produced episodes, but was aired and packaged on the season nine DVD as a single episode. Season nine averaged 2.38 million viewers, ranking #129 out of the 140 broadcast primetime shows.

== Episodes ==
No. overall	No. in season	Title	Directed by	Written by	Original release date	Prod. code	U.S. viewers (millions)
175	1	"Savior"	Kevin G. Fair	Kelly Souders & Brian Peterson	September 25, 2009	3X5251	2.57
Lois returns from the future with no memory of the three weeks she was missing. Meanwhile, Clark has been training with Jor-El (voiced by Terence Stamp), while also branding his family crest around Metropolis after saving someone as The Blur. After saving Lois, Clark's feelings for her cause a disruption in his training and he realizes that the only way to finish is if he tells Lois goodbye. Dr. Emil Hamilton (Alessandro Juliani) and Chloe begin working together in the Watchtower. Released from the black orb, Major Zod's soldiers initially turn on him when he fails to provide answers as to why none of them have the true powers of a Kryptonian like they should. Eventually, Zod regains their trust. A Kandorian woman, Alia (Monique Ganderton), returns from the future with Lois in the hope of killing Clark. When the two meet, Alia releases blue kryptonite that nullifies hers and Clark's powers. In the battle, Alia is accidentally killed when she impales herself but not before revealing that Clark will cause the destruction of Earth. Just as she is falling asleep, Lois has sporadic visions of future events.
176	2	"Metallo"	Mairzee Almas	Don Whitehead & Holly Henderson	October 2, 2009	3X5252	2.24
Daily Planet reporter John Corben (Brian Austin Green) is hit by a truck while trying to ascertain the Blur's identity. When he wakes up, Corben discovers that his body has been outfitted with robotic parts, and his heart replaced with a piece of kryptonite that acts as a power source for his body. Tess later discovers that Zod and his men were the ones who "helped" Corben, but only as a means to test a new way for them to get their powers. While helping the Blur, Lois is kidnapped by Corben as a means of drawing the Blur out. Clark arrives and fuses a lead plate to Corben's chest with his heat vision to protect himself from the kryptonite. When Corben pulls the plate off it removes the kryptonite and shuts down his vitals. Clark and Chloe realize that Tess is after Lois's memories, so it is decided that Clark must return to society so that he can keep Tess from learning that he will be the cause of Earth's destruction.
177	3	"Rabid"	Michael Rohl	Jordan Hawley	October 9, 2009	3X5253	2.28
After Tess is admitted to the hospital showing zombie-like symptoms, Clark has Emil investigate the cause with a Disease Control specialist. Clark overhears that Tess was at the Daily Planet when she began to show symptoms, so he speeds to the Planet to rescue Lois. In a battle with multiple zombie attackers, Lois is bitten. Clark then volunteers his blood to Emil, who discovers that the virus was created from Kryptonian enzymes, so the doctor can create a cure. With Chloe's help, Emil manufactures a rainstorm and seeds the clouds with the cure to create maximum coverage. It is revealed that the virus was used as a ploy to draw out the Blur as one of Zod's men realizes that he was also Kryptonian. Based on the House of El symbol the Blur brands around town, Zod believes that Jor-El is on Earth and has harnessed the power from the yellow Sun for himself. Oliver decides to burn his Green Arrow outfit and give up trying to be a superhero.
178	4	"Echo"	Wayne Rose	Bryan Miller	October 16, 2009	3X5254	2.59
Jor-El gives Clark the ability to hear others' thoughts in an effort to teach Clark to hone his Kryptonian intuition and learn to not allow humanistic assumptions inhibit his destiny. While using this new ability to determine who blew up a Queen Industries textile factory, Clark also learns more about Lois's feelings for him and asks her out on a date. Clark has to stand Lois up (although she soon after shows up at the gala) when he learns that the Toyman (Chris Gauthier) has returned to get revenge on Oliver. Jor-El takes back the new ability, forcing Clark to use the instincts he has gained. At a company gala, Toyman informs Oliver that there is a bomb directly under the podium, and that he will kill everyone if Oliver does not confess to killing Lex. Clark locates the real bomb before Oliver can take his own life with it to pay for the sins he feels he committed. Toyman is caught, and Tess gives him Corben's kryptonite-powered heart so he can tell her how it works.
179	5	"Roulette"	Kevin G. Fair	Genevieve Sparling	October 23, 2009	3X5256	2.47
At a casino, Oliver meets a woman named Victoria, who goes by the name Roulette (Steph Song) and gives him a red pill to swallow. Afterward, Oliver passes out and wakes up trapped inside a coffin. After breaking out, Oliver finds himself in the middle of someone else's deadly game designed to make him pay for destroying someone. Oliver finds Roulette in the casino, but the two go on the run when the people behind the game show up. While escaping, Victoria is killed and Oliver is arrested. Eventually, with Chloe and Clark's help, Oliver comes to the conclusion that Roulette created the game to distract Oliver long enough to empty the $3 billion he had in his bank account. In reality, Chloe orchestrated the entire event to get Oliver to realize that he is still the hero he once was. In addition, Clark discovers that there are other Kryptonians on Earth.
180	6	"Crossfire"	Michael Rohl	Don Whitehead & Holly Henderson	October 30, 2009	3X5257	2.42
While Lois and Clark prepare to host a new morning talk show, Oliver attempts to train a prostitute/cage fighter, Mia Dearden (Elise Gatien), to be mentally stronger after witnessing her battle with her own personal demons just as he did. In addition, Tess unknowingly builds a solar powered energy plant that will allow Zod the chance to harness the powers of the sun for his own machinations. Zod tells Tess to locate the Blur for him. Oliver confesses to Lois that he still loves her—while Clark witnesses from a video camera—but she acknowledges that she wants Clark and not him. Mia betrays Oliver to her pimp Ricky (Michael Adamthwaite), who kidnaps and tries to rob him; Clark overhears the fight and manages to save everyone. In the end, Oliver gives Mia a second chance and Clark shows Lois his true feelings when he kisses her.
181	7	"Kandor"	Jeannot Szwarc	Al Septien & Turi Meyer	November 6, 2009	3X5258	2.63
Zod recalls to his troops how twenty years before the destruction of Krypton, the Ruling Council took their blood shortly before the destruction of Kandor, which is what was used to clone each of them on Earth. Just as Clark realizes that his father is on Earth while investigating a Kandorian landing in the desert, Jor-El (Julian Sands) arrives at the Kent farm. Chloe finds Jor-El and fills him in on the man his son has become, as well as the revelation that Zod—who was once Jor-El's best friend—was responsible for Krypton's destruction. After kidnapping Jor-El, Zod discovers that Jor-El's son is on Earth and that he is the Blur. Zod releases Jor-El, mortally wounded, who unknowingly leads Zod to Clark. As his dying wish, Jor-El requests that Clark save Zod from whom he will one day become.
182	8	"Idol"	Glen Winter	Anne Cofell Saunders	November 13, 2009	3X5255	2.68
In an attempt to fuel the legend of the Blur, twins Jayna and Zan (Allison Scagliotti and David Gallagher) — who have the ability to morph into animals and water-based forms, respectively — begin performing saves around Metropolis and painting Clark's shield at the scene of the crime. Those mistakes made by the twins push the Blur under scrutiny from the District Attorney Ray Sacks (Dylan Neal), who challenges the Blur to reveal himself. Meanwhile, Lois accidentally hears Clark's voice while talking to the Blur, and goes out of her way to convince the citizens that it is best if the Blur does not reveal himself. With help from the twins and Chloe, Lois is convinced that Clark and the Blur are not the same person. Clark encourages the twins to continue using their powers to help others after helping to defeat Sacks, but to be more careful. Clark confesses to Lois that his "big secret" is that he is near-sighted, pulling out a pair of glasses. Lois responds by kissing Clark, but visions of the future send her into a seizure.
183	9	"Pandora"	Morgan Beggs	Drew Landis & Julia Swift	November 20, 2009	3X5259	2.42
Tess kidnaps Lois and uses a memory reading machine from Sommerholt Institute to try to discover Lois's lost memories. In order to see how Zod "saves humanity", Tess synchronizes her brain with Lois's so that she can live through the memories. In the future, the solar powered energy plant LuthorCorp builds is used to harness the solar radiation from the sun—turning it red and stripping Clark of his powers—and provide Zod and his troops with all of their natural powers. In the present, Clark discovers that Tess has Lois, but when he attempts to remove Lois from the machine he inadvertently syncs his own brain to hers. Through Lois's memories, Clark realizes that when he decided to fight Zod he pushed Zod down the road that led to Zod's tyranny over Earth. As a result, Clark decides to follow his father's dying wish and save Zod from himself by befriending him. In addition, he and Lois decide to start dating.
184	10	"Disciple"	Mairzee Almas	Jordan Hawley	January 29, 2010	3X5260	2.49
After a date with Clark, Lois is shot with an arrow by a man dressed as Green Arrow. Chloe is also attacked by the same individual. Oliver begins investigating and discovers that his old mentor Vordigan (Steve Bacic) is the one behind the attacks. Meanwhile, Zod tells Clark that the Kryptonians are waiting on Clark to help them all get their powers, and that they will resort to anything to get them. Oliver's old mentor kidnaps Mia and uses her as bait to lure Oliver in and force him to kill Vordigan, who believes that he must die at the hands of his own disciple. Instead, Oliver only injures Vordigan and leaves him for the police. After Clark discovers that Zod visited Lois in the hospital, Clark tells him that he will not help the Kryptonians gain their powers and threatens to destroy all of them if they go near Lois again.
185	11 (Note: The writers consider "Absolute Justice" two separately produced episodes, but The CW broadcast them as a single episode, and later packaged it as a single episode in the season nine DVD. Therefore, "Absolute Justice" is both the 185th and 186th episode produced, but only the 185th episode aired.)	"Absolute Justice"	Glen Winter ("Society")	Geoff Johns	February 5, 2010	3X5261	2.77
185	11	"Absolute Justice"	Tom Welling ("Legends")	Geoff Johns	February 5, 2010	3X5262	2.77
"Society": After Sylvester Pemberton (Jim Shields), formerly the superhero Star-Spangled Kid, is killed by supervillain Icicle (Wesley MacInnes), Chloe and Clark begin investigating the murder. The pair discover that Sylvester was part of a group known as the Justice Society of America (JSA), which was led by Carter Hall / Hawkman (Michael Shanks) and includes Kent Nelson / Doctor Fate (Brent Stait). They also learn that Hawkman and the rest of the JSA have been monitoring Clark and his superhero friends. After Icicle kills Wesley Dodds / Sandman (Ken Lawson), Hawkman and Sylvester's apprentice Courtney Whitmore / Stargirl (Britt Irvin) decide to set a trap for Icicle. In the process, Oliver interrupts the trap, which causes Hawkman to threaten his life. "Legends": Doctor Fate informs Clark that he will lead the new generation of superheroes, just as Hawkman led the JSA. Oliver calls in John Jones (Phil Morris), who helps convince Hawkman, Stargirl, and Doctor Fate to work with Oliver, Clark, and himself to bring down Icicle. At the same time, Lois receives a package from an organization known as Checkmate, led by Amanda Waller (Pam Grier), which leads Lois to discover the existence of the JSA. Split up into pairs, Doctor Fate saves John from Icicle's attack, sacrificing himself and giving John his powers back at the same time. Banding together, Clark, Oliver, John, Hawkman, and Stargirl defeat Icicle. Hawkman and Stargirl decide to locate the other members of the JSA, their children, and protégés to help organize a new generation of superheroes. Icicle is transported back to Waller, who shoots him and later meets with Tess, revealed to be another agent of Checkmate.
186	12	"Warrior"	Allison Mack	Bryan Miller	February 12, 2010	3X5263	2.48
After stealing an enchanted Warrior Angel comic book, adolescent Alec Abrams (Owen Best) is transformed into super-powered adult "Steven Swift" (Carlo Marks). With his new abilities, Alec saves Chloe's life. Thinking that Alec is another superhero, Chloe tries to get to know him and recruit him to Clark and Oliver's super-powered team. At the same time, Zatanna (Serinda Swan) returns and informs Clark that her father was the one who cursed the comic book that turned Alec into Warrior Angel, and enlists Clark's help to track down Alec so that she can reverse the spell. After finding the comic, Zatanna and Clark realize that the story is not about a young boy that becomes a hero, but about becoming the villain Devilicus. When Chloe attempts to convince Alec to have the curse reversed, Alec turns on her and attempts to throw her off a building. Before he can, Clark saves Chloe and Zatanna reverses the spell, returning Alec back to normal.
187	13	"Persuasion"	Christopher Petry	Anne Cofell Saunders	February 19, 2010	3X5265	2.44
Clark is unknowingly exposed to a new form of kryptonite that gives him the power of hypnosis. As a result, Lois quits her job at the Daily Planet and moves in with Clark after he tells her he wants a more traditional relationship. Once Clark finds out about his new power, he goes to Zod to see if he can force Zod to reveal who killed Jor-El. Zod tells Clark that Tess murdered his father, and tries to convince Clark to seek vengeance. After refusing to kill anyone, Clark accidentally hypnotizes himself into seeking revenge and he goes after Tess. Before Clark can kill her, Chloe uses green kryptonite to weaken Clark, which also removes the hypnosis from everyone, including Clark. Zod discovers that Alia killed Jor-El for fear that he would destroy all of the Kandorian clones. As is Kryptonian law, Zod kills Alia for her actions. Clark learns the truth, but still does not trust Zod. As such, Clark destroys the LuthorCorp solar towers, which Zod hoped would bring him powers of his own.
188	14	"Conspiracy"	Turi Meyer	Al Septien & Turi Meyer	February 26, 2010	3X5264	2.54
Bernard Chisholm (J. R. Bourne), a doctor who was experimented on by Kandorian scientists, begins kidnapping those same Kandorians, including Faora's (Sharon Taylor) sister Vala (Crystal Lowe), in order to expose them to the world. Chisholm tries to persuade Lois to write the story. When she refuses, he kidnaps her and forces her to write it. Clark attempts to locate the missing Kandorians and is confronted by Zod, who knows that Clark destroyed the solar towers. Meanwhile, Oliver discovers that Chloe has been stealing money from his company in order to build kryptonite weapons to use against the Kandorians should they get their powers back. Oliver decides that Clark needs to know, but not until the time is right. Zod locates Chisholm, but he is shot in the stomach during his rescue attempt. Clark arrives and saves Lois and Vala, but watches as Zod dies from massive blood loss. Using his own blood, Clark resurrects Zod. The next day, Zod pretends to make a pact with Clark to help the Kandorians adapt to Earth. Once Clark leaves, he reveals that he has gained the powers he was missing thanks to Clark's blood.
189	15	"Escape"	Kevin G. Fair	Genevieve Sparling	April 2, 2010	3X5266	2.13
Clark and Lois head to the McDougal Inn for the weekend and find Chloe and Oliver having their own romantic getaway. While settling in, Lois unwittingly releases the spirit of Siobhan McDougal (Odessa Rae), who was cursed and sent to live in the underworld, from a painting at the inn. Known as the Silver Banshee by the villagers, the spirit transfers from one woman to the next, looking to murder any men who come into her path. Eventually, Chloe discovers that destroying the portrait of Siobhan with fire will send the spirit back to the underworld, so she throws the picture into a lit fireplace. Meanwhile, Tess reveals to Zod that she knows he has his powers and also proves to him that she knows his weakness when she opens a box of kryptonite around him. Zod reveals that he is jealous of Clark, as the latter has won the love of the city. Zod, pretending to be the Blur, contacts Lois and requests that she find information on Tess.
190	16	"Checkmate"	Tim Scanlan	John Chisholm	April 9, 2010	3X5267	1.99
Tess and other Checkmate agents kidnap Green Arrow. While in transport to the organization, Waller, the White Queen, attempts to recruit Green Arrow, unaware that he is Oliver, to a government cause designed around preparing for a potential alien invasion. Green Arrow declines and escapes. With Oliver missing, Clark and Chloe search surveillance feeds. John Jones, who is also investigating, discovers the location of Checkmate's home base. There, he learns Waller has a sample of Kryptonian blood. Meanwhile, Oliver returns to Metropolis, only to have Tess realize that he is Green Arrow. Tess informs Oliver and Clark that Checkmate has kidnapped Watchtower, who was the real target. Clark heads to the Checkmate base and saves Chloe. John destroys the sample of blood and uses his abilities to erase Waller's memory of Clark, Chloe, and Oliver's faces, preserving their identities. Afterward, Clark tells John that Waller may have been correct about an alien invasion, recalling his vision of the future.
191	17	"Upgrade"	Michael Rohl	Drew Landis & Julia Swift	April 16, 2010	3X5268	1.56
Based on a tip from Zod, who is posing as the Blur, Lois infiltrates one of Tess's secret labs and discovers she is experimenting with kryptonite. An explosion in the lab sends Lois down an elevator shaft, where she is saved by John Corben. Clark tracks down the lab Lois was investigating, where he is exposed to red kryptonite. Now without any inhibitions, Clark discovers that Chloe and Oliver have been stock piling kryptonite weapons, so he joins forces with Zod, who reveals that he has powers, to seek out and destroy all of them. Afterward, Clark takes Zod to the Fortress. Chloe sends Corben to the Fortress to flush the red kryptonite out of Clark's system by stabbing him with a piece of green kryptonite. Corben is successful and, using Clark's octagonal key, he teleports himself back to Smallville. When Clark returns to normal, he finds Zod has vanished. Zod later returns to the Fortress with his troops, using a kryptonite dagger to cut his hand and use his blood to give his troops all of his powers.
192	18	"Charade"	Brian Peterson	Don Whitehead & Holly Henderson	April 23, 2010	3X5269	2.05
The new Daily Planet editor Franklin Stern (Blu Mankuma) pits Lois and Clark against each other for the right to keep their job, but the pair decide to write the ultimate story on Sacks, whose conviction was overturned. Their story ultimately collapses when the two of them become front page news for fighting at Sacks's "Welcome Back" party. As a result, Stern fires both of them. Clark discovers that Lois has been talking to someone posing as the Blur. When he tries to figure out who is really talking to Lois, the pressure of unmasking the Blur puts a strain on their relationship. Checkmate's Black King, Maxwell Lord (Gil Bellows), kidnaps Lois and attempts to discover the identity of the Blur by combining the memories of people who have seen glimpses of the Blur into a single, cohesive identity. Clark prevents Lord from completing the image and Lord's actions bring him face to face with the unidentified Red Queen. As the Blur, Clark calls Lois and tells her they can never talk again, because of the danger their relationship poses to Lois.
193	19	"Sacrifice"	Kevin G. Fair	Story by : Justin Hartley & Walter Wong; Teleplay by : Justin Hartley & Walter Wong and Bryan Miller	April 30, 2010	3X5270	1.89
Checkmate breaches the Watchtower computer firewalls and begins stealing information. Clark, needing to find Zod, sends Oliver to the Luthor mansion to look through Tess's things to see if he can find any information. At the same time, Clark talks to Faora and reveals to her that Zod has had powers for weeks and that he was the reason Krypton was destroyed. Armed with this new information, Faora attempts to organize the remaining Kandorians to seek out peace with humans and stand against Zod. Meanwhile, Oliver finds Zod at the mansion and they get in a fight that leaves Oliver with a House of Zod symbol branded on his chest. Checkmate locates the Kandorians and attempts to execute them, but Clark arrives and saves them. Zod confronts Faora about her betrayal and subsequently kills her; afterward he learns she was pregnant with his child. Zod, now honored with the rank of "General", uses Faora's death, blaming it on humans, to bring the rest of the Kandorians to his cause.
194	20	"Hostage"	Glen Winter	Jordan Hawley & Anne Cofell Saunders	May 7, 2010	3X5271	1.91
Martha Kent (Annette O'Toole) returns to Smallville with Perry White (Michael McKean), whom she is dating, to Clark's surprise. Lois informs Clark that they should break up, as she needs to find her true calling in life. Subsequently, Lois and Perry team up on a story about the Book of Rao and the Red Queen that could help Lois regain her job at the Daily Planet. The pair fail to land the story, but a good word to the editor-in-chief from Perry allows Lois and Clark to return to the Planet. Meanwhile, Lord kidnaps Tess in an effort to find the Book of Rao. Tess escapes only to be caught by the Red Queen, revealed to be Martha, and is forced to give the book to her. Clark discovers Martha's secret and asks for the Book of Rao. She reluctantly gives him the book, explaining that it can exile all Kryptonians to another plane of existence, including Clark.
195	21	"Salvation"	Greg Beeman	Al Septien & Turi Meyer	May 14, 2010	3X5272	2.40
Zod appears to Lois claiming to be the Blur and accusing Clark of trying to reveal Zod's secret. Tess confronts Zod with kryptonite at the Fortress in an effort to save Clark, but Zod uses his heat vision to burn her and leave her for dead before destroying the main console of the Fortress. Clark takes Tess to the hospital, where she tells him there is a second console that will activate the Book of Rao. Tess is later pronounced dead at the hospital and a shrouded woman enters the room. Zod attacks Lois when she discovers he is not the Blur, but Clark saves her and reveals his true identity to her through a kiss. Zod's troops learn of his deceptive actions and agree to follow Clark to their new home through the book. Zod uses a blue kryptonite dagger to make him and Clark human, and keep them from ascending. Clark intentionally stabs himself with it and falls off the roof of a building, leaving Zod without its protection and forcing him to ascend with the others off Earth.

== Cast and characters ==
=== Main ===
- Tom Welling as Clark Kent / The Blur
- Allison Mack as Chloe Sullivan
- Erica Durance as Lois Lane (Note: Absent in three episodes)
- Cassidy Freeman as Tess Mercer (Note: Absent in four episodes)
- Callum Blue as Major Zod (Note: Absent in nine episodes)
- Justin Hartley as Oliver Queen / Green Arrow

=== Recurring ===
- Alessandro Juliani as Dr. Emil Hamilton
- Monique Ganderton as Alia
- Sharon Taylor as Faora
- Adrian Holmes as Basqat
- Ryan McDonell as Stuart Campbell
- Phil Morris as John Jones
- Crystal Lowe as Vala

== Production ==
=== Writing ===
In an interview, Justin Hartley revealed that season nine partially deals with his character Oliver Queen having to battle his personal demons: "I think he is going to struggle with the things he has been afforded (as a result of) his powers. He has sacrificed things and done things that haunt him... It's bad stuff. We need to get to the bottom of it". Executive producer Brian Peterson stated that this season sees Clark Kent taking his "Red-Blue Blur" persona into obsessive territory: "He is trying a little too hard to be a hero, and is leaving the rest of his life behind". Entertainment Weekly's Michael Ausiello revealed at the time that the season featured major developments to the Clark/Lois Lane relationship, but also that Superman's "iconic 'S'" is featured significantly throughout the season, including on Clark's chest. The theme for season nine revolves around "Clark's darkest hour"; a love-triangle between Clark, Lois, and the Red-Blue Blur that will last for the season; tension between Chloe Sullivan and Clark as the former realizes she is not satisfied just being a "sidekick"; and that the creative team is, as Ausiello noted, not "story-wise, approaching this season as Smallville's last". A scene between Clark and Jor-El has been constructed for the premiere to explain why Clark has not learned to fly. Clark and Oliver's friendship also became tense thanks to Oliver's growing interest in rekindling his romantic relationship with Lois, Zod brings multiple Kryptonians to Earth with him, and Jor-El makes a physical appearance on the series.

Peterson and executive producer Kelly Souders revealed in an interview that Clark would be training to take one-step closer to his ultimate destiny as Superman, and that Clark would be wearing a costume while performing his Red-Blue Blur duties. The pair explained that this season's theme is also about Clark "embracing the fact that he is an alien". That said, Souders has stated that she would not refer to Clark himself as "darker", because he is still "the Superman underneath it all that we all know and love". E! Online's Natalie Abrams revealed, following the Smallville panel, that Clark's suit would be black, with a silver Superman "S" on the front, as well a trench coat that doubles as a cape. Based on the information released at the panel, Abrams reported that the producers had a series finale prepared should this season be the last. Although it was initially stated that star Tom Welling would direct two episodes he only directed one, due to his responsibilities producing the series Hellcats (2010–2011). Allison Mack directed one episode.

=== Characters ===
Making return appearances this season are Toyman, who last appeared in season eight's episode "Requiem", along with another appearance from John Jones. Serinda Swan returned as Zatanna for the episode "Warrior". The characters Victor Stone and Dinah Lance returned for the season finale; Victor has not been seen since the season six episode "Justice", and Dinah has not made an appearance since the season eight finale.

Callum Blue was also cast in the series regular role of Zod. His character was first mentioned in season five, when Brainiac used Lex Luthor's body as a physical vessel for Zod's spirit to inhabit. In an interview, Peterson and Souders explained that this version of Zod is different from the one who appeared in prior seasons. The execs classify this incarnation as "Major Zod", as opposed to his typical "General Zod" identifier and reveal that throughout season nine "the venomous side of Zod rises because he experiences a few key betrayals with our beloved characters". Zod is also accompanied by Kryptonians Faora, his wife in the comics, and Basqat. Julian Sands was cast as Jor-El for the episode "Kandor". Until then, Jor-El has been a disembodied voice emanating from Clark's ship in season two, the Kawatche cave walls in season three and four, and then the Fortress of Solitude from season five onward. Former series regular Annette O'Toole and guest star Michael McKean reprised their roles as Martha Kent and Perry White, respectively. O'Toole has not made an appearance since the season six finale, when her character left for the United States Senate, and McKean has not appeared since his first guest appearance in season three. Both actors appeared in the penultimate episode of the season. Peterson revealed that White's reintroduction into the series shows him moving closer to his destiny as the editor-in-chief of the Daily Planet, as well as his first meeting with Lois, while Martha and Clark's reunion had an "unexpected surprise".

Brian Austin Green was cast to portray Metallo for the first two episodes of this season, and made a third appearance in the seventeenth episode. The executive producers also brought in DC Comics character Roulette, portrayed by Steph Song. In an interview, Song revealed that she reviewed the character's comic book backstory beforehand, but that she wanted to make it known that the character has her own agenda in the episode. Clarifying, even though Roulette is sent after Oliver by someone else, she always stays "five steps ahead of everyone else". Roulette's famous tattoo, a dragon going up her leg and wrapping around her torso, appears in the episode. Song stated that she spent three days in testing, where the creative team drew the tattoo onto her body and then took pictures of how it appeared before making a transfer with color. The season also introduces the Wonder Twins (Zan and Jayna) and Green Arrow's sidekick Mia Dearden. Smallville's version of Mia is HIV-positive just like her comic book counterpart. Souders explained that she has a sordid past and crosses paths with Oliver in some shady places, but he gives her a hope. The Wonder Twins, who first appeared in the Super Friends Saturday morning cartoons, have their traditional abilities of being able to transform into various forms of water and animal life. The twins' blue monkey Gleek appears as a decoration on Jayna's cellphone, with his laugh being the ringtone.

Geoff Johns returned to write an episode featuring the Justice Society of America (JSA); he previously wrote the episode "Legion", which introduced the Legion of Super-Heroes, in season eight. According to Johns, the JSA is a team of superheroes who "started it all-like the Watchmen" and "come out of retirement to give 'the screwed-up guys of the next generation a needed smack down'". Michael Shanks, Brent Stait, and Brittney Irvin portrayed Carter Hall / Hawkman, Kent Nelson / Doctor Fate, and Courtney Whitmore / Stargirl, respectively, in the double-length episode. Shanks wears the traditional Hawkman uniform, complete with strap-on wings and Hawkman's mace. Shanks spent time practicing his wirework for the flying scenes he would have to film while in full costume. One difference in the costume is the inclusion of a chest plate. According to Shanks, the costume designers added a chest plate to assist the flying harness they created. The chest plate and Hawkman's helmet were given a bronze color, as opposed to the more traditional "yellow/gold" color. Smallville's version of Hawkman uses the backstory that Carter is a "reincarnated prince from a thousand years ago", and worked alongside a group of superheroes in the 1970s. Shanks states that the JSA arrives to provide some "tough love" to Clark and his superhero friends, who are reaching a point in their lives where they are trying to find their own destinies. Although they do not appear, Shanks points out that there are references to other JSA members throughout the episode. Shanks and Irvin reprised their roles for the season finale.

Pam Grier was cast as the DC Comics villainess Amanda Waller for "multiple episodes". Odessa Rae was cast as the villainess Siobhan McDougal, also known as Silver Banshee. Smallville's McDougal is characterized as a "vengeful spirit of a fallen Gaelic heroine". The tenth episode features a "bad guy version" of Green Arrow, known as the "Dark Archer", played by Steve Bacic. Carlo Marks was cast to play Steven Swift / Warrior Angel, a potential love interest for Chloe. Gil Bellows portrayed the DC Comics villain Maxwell Lord in two episodes of the season.

== Reception ==
The season nine premiere, "Savior", pulled in viewership ratings of 2.58 million viewers. The CW issued a statement noting that Smallville did outperform every previous show on the network in the Friday 8:00 pm time slot in a year. Smallville returned in January 2010 after a two-month hiatus.

Ken Tucker from Entertainment Weekly said the first hour of the episode "Absolute Justice" contained the "stand-out visual sequence" and thought the second hour was "more lumbering", with the big fight sequence toward the end "unsatisfying". Tucker wrote: "For viewers who only know the Superman/boy mythos according to Smallville, it must have seemed strange to have most of the series' ongoing subplots put in storage for this week's two-hour edition. Then again, since the villain of this piece was a faux-hawked foe called the Icicle, frozen plotlines were inevitable". When referring to "Warrior", he called Serinda Swan's portrayal of Zatanna "smart" and said her dialogue with Clark was "crisp" which made Lois' jealousy understandable.

In March 2010, after The CW announced that Smallville would be back for its tenth season, Smallville improved the network's overall Friday performance in the 8:00 pm – 9:00 pm time period by 67% among adults 18–34, 200% in men 18–34, 75% in adults 18–49, 183% in men 18–49 and 74% in total viewers.

== Home media release ==
The complete ninth season of Smallville was released on September 7, 2010, in North America in both DVD and Blu-ray format. The DVD and Blu-ray box set were also released in Region 2 and 4 on October 25, 2010, and June 22, 2011, respectively. The box set included various special features, including episode commentary, a documentary on the Zod character titled "Kneel Before Zod", and a documentary on how the creative team brought the Justice League to Smallville called "Justice to All".
