= Reign of Doomsday =

2011 comic book storyline by DC Comics

- The principal characters of the Reign of Doomsday crossover, art by Kenneth Rocafort.
- Publisher: DC Comics
- Publication date: January 2011
- Genre: Superhero; Crossover

Creative team
- Writer(s): Steve Lyons; Dan DiDio; James Robinson; Jeff Lemire; Paul Cornell
- Penciller(s): Ed Benes; Philip Tan; Brett Booth; Miguel Sepulveda; Marco Rudy; Kenneth Rocafort; Axel Giménez

"Reign of Doomsday" is a 2011 comic book crossover storyline published by DC Comics that ran through the Superman family of books, The Outsiders and The Justice League of America. The crossover involves Doomsday hunting down Steel, Superboy, Eradicator, and Cyborg Superman, the four main characters introduced following The Death of Superman storyline in 1992. Though the current iteration of the character was not present in the original The Death of Superman storyline, Supergirl appears in the crossover as well due to being part of the Justice League. The storyline draws its title from Reign of the Supermen, the immediate follow-up to The Death of Superman.

== Publication history ==
The crossover began in January 2011 in the Steel one-shot published as part of the DC Icons line. The crossover continued in Outsiders #37, where Doomsday faced Eradicator, Justice League of America #55, and Superman/Batman Annual #5, both of which involved him facing Supergirl and Cyborg Superman, Superboy #6, where he faced Superboy, and Action Comics #900-904, where he faced Superman. The storyline concluded in #904, the final issue of the first volume of Action Comics preceding the title's relaunch as part of The New 52.

The latter half of the story, from Action 900-904, was collected as a hardcover in February 2012 (978-1-4012-3345-7) and reprinted as a trade paperback in March 2013 (978-1-4012-3688-5).

== Plot ==
When Doomsday lands in Metropolis, Steel fights the creature and loses. Doomsday takes Steel and departs from the scene. Doomsday attacks the Outsiders in Markovia, intent on finding Eradicator. After defeating Eradicator and his teammates, Doomsday flees the battlefield with his body. Doomsday attacks the Alpha Lantern Boodikka and several members of the Justice League. Cyborg Superman emerges from Boodikka's body and reveals that Doomsday has come for him. Cyborg Superman wounds Doomsday, who assimilates Cyborg Superman's nanotechnology and rebuilds himself into Cyborg Doomsday. Supergirl arrives and aids Cyborg Superman against Doomsday, but Doomsday overpowers them both and teleports away with their bodies.

Doomsday subsequently attacks Superboy. Superboy is overwhelmed, and Doomsday teleports to an alien spacecraft on the ruins of New Krypton. Superman discovers this was part of a plot by Lex Luthor (who had previously been given Doomsday's corpse by Sam Lane) to distract him from Luthor's goal of finding a Black Lantern power ring. With Luthor defeated, Superman finds his allies trapped in a pocket dimension. Superman attempts to free his allies, only for them to discover the inert body of Doomsday as well as three clones of him who were designed to eliminate the Superman they were sent after. Superman and his allies escape, taking the original Doomsday with them. Steel notices Doomsday is beginning to regain his brain activity when they are attacked by the Doomsday clones. The heroes are met by another Doomsday clone, Doomslayer. The Eradicator, against Superman's suggestion, fights the Doomslayer and is destroyed.

Doomslayer intends to crash the ship into Earth and attacks Doomsday. Superman defends Doomsday, believing Doomsday has the potential for redemption. The heroes escape the ship with the original Doomsday. Superman and his allies try to stop the ship from crashing, but are not strong enough. Superman advises Superboy, Supergirl and Steel to escape while he slows the ship down, intending to sacrifice himself. The ship falls in Metropolis's bay and creates a massive tidal wave. Superboy, Supergirl and Steel dissipate the tidal wave, saving Metropolis. As Superman crawls out of the sea, Doomslayer attacks the city with the Doomsday clones.

The Doomsday clones spread across the world, wreaking havoc. Doomsday awakens, but the Eradicator speaks through him. The Eradicator, as a being of pure information, leaps into the technology Luthor used to clone Doomsday so that he could control the original Doomsday. As the heroes fight the Doomsday clones, Eradicator begins to feel Doomsday's mind regaining control of the body. The Eradicator sacrifices himself to send Doomslayer and the other clones to another dimension.

== Titles ==
In addition to the Steel one-shot, the crossover includes issues of Justice League of America, Outsiders, Superman/Batman, Superboy and Action Comics.

- Part 1: Steel #1 (January)
- Part 2: Outsiders (vol. 4) #37 (March)
- Part 3: Justice League of America (vol. 2) #55 (March)
- Part 4: Superman/Batman Annual #5 (April)
- Part 5: Superboy (vol. 4) #6 (April)
- Part 6: Action Comics #900 (April) - this issue is also the conclusion to Lex Luthor's The Black Ring storyline.

Beginning with part 7, the storyline was retitled The Reign of the Doomsdays:

- Part 7: Action Comics #901 (May)
- Part 8: Action Comics #902 (June)
- Part 9: Action Comics #903 (July)
- Part 10: Action Comics #904 (August) - conclusion and final issue of Action Comics volume 1.
