= Smallville season 8 =

2008/2009 season of the US TV show Smallville

Smallville
- Season 8
- DVD and Blu-ray cover featuring Tom Welling and Erica Durance
- Showrunners: Brian Peterson; Kelly Souders; Todd Slavkin; Darren Swimmer
- Starring: Tom Welling; Allison Mack; Erica Durance; Aaron Ashmore; Cassidy Freeman; Sam Witwer; Justin Hartley
- No. of episodes: 22

Release
- Original network: The CW
- Original release: September 18, 2008 – May 14, 2009

Season chronology
- ← Previous; Season 7 Next → Season 9

The eighth season of Smallville, an American television series developed by Alfred Gough and Miles Millar, began airing on September 18, 2008, on The CW. The series recounts the early adventures of Kryptonian Clark Kent as he adjusts to life in the fictional town of Smallville, Kansas, during the years before he becomes Superman. The eighth season comprises 22 episodes and concluded its initial airing on May 14, 2009. Regular cast members during season eight include Tom Welling, Allison Mack, Erica Durance, and Aaron Ashmore, along with new series regulars Cassidy Freeman, Sam Witwer, and Justin Hartley, the latter previously featured as a guest star in seasons six and seven.

This season focuses on Clark (Welling) as he starts his job at the Daily Planet, begins to accept more of his destiny as Earth's hero, and develops romantic feelings for Lois Lane (Durance). While Lex Luthor is presumed dead and Lana Lang has left Smallville for good, Clark meets new characters Davis Bloome (Witwer), Smallville's interpretation of Doomsday, as well as the new CEO of LuthorCorp, Tess Mercer (Freeman). In other storylines, Clark and Oliver Queen (Hartley) clash over how to handle Lex when he resurfaces, while Chloe Sullivan (Mack) and Jimmy Olsen (Ashmore) take their relationship to the next level. In addition, this season sees the appearance of more DC Comics characters, including Toyman, Bruno Mannheim, and Zatanna, with recurring appearances from Plastique and members of the Legion of Super-Heroes.

Following the end of season seven, Kristin Kreuk and Michael Rosenbaum, who portrayed Lana and Lex since the pilot episode, did not return as regulars for the eighth season, though Kreuk did return as a recurring guest to conclude Lana's story. Laura Vandervoort and John Glover also departed the series after season seven; Glover's character Lionel Luthor was killed off while Vandervoort was written out of the series after one season but made one guest appearance in this season. Gough and Millar also departed the series, allowing Kelly Souders, Brian Peterson, Todd Slavkin, and Darren Swimmer to continue as executive producers. This allowed the series to "reinvigorate" itself by introducing new characters and storylines, as well as developing Clark's understanding of his destiny.

Averaging 3.74 million viewers per episode, the season out-ranked other high-profile shows on the network, such as Reaper and Gossip Girl. It also received an Emmy Award nomination in the Sound Editing for a Series category.

== Episodes ==
No. overall	No. in season	Title	Directed by	Written by	Original release date	Prod. code	U.S. viewers (millions)
153	1	"Odyssey"	Kevin G. Fair	Story by : Brian Peterson & Kelly Souders; Teleplay by : Todd Slavkin & Darren Swimmer	September 18, 2008	3T7451	4.34
After the collapse of the Fortress, Oliver, Arthur Curry (Alan Ritchson), and Dinah Lance (Alaina Huffman) set out searching for Clark. At the same time, newly promoted Tess Mercer also begins searching for Lex. Oliver discovers that Clark is being held captive in Russia and leaves to rescue him. Chloe is revealed to be in the custody of LuthorCorp, who have been testing her developing powers, which now include super-intelligence. Lex's assistant Regan Matthews (Ari Cohen) has been using Chloe to locate the members of Oliver's team. Oliver and Clark, who has lost his powers, arrive at the LuthorCorp site and rescue Chloe, Arthur, and Dinah. Martian Manhunter (Phil Morris) arrives and restores Clark's powers, at the cost of his own. Chloe no longer has the ability to heal but still possesses her extreme intelligence powers. Tess finds and keeps the key Clark used to start the Fortress. Jimmy asks Chloe to forget his proposal but she says yes to it anyway. Afterwards, Clark decides that he must leave the farm and pursue a new life, one that is free from the things that have been holding him back from his destiny. After learning Lex is still alive, the heroes split up to find him and protect their identities. Clark starts his internship in the Daily Planet with Lois as his co-worker.
154	2	"Plastique"	Rick Rosenthal	Don Whitehead & Holly Henderson	September 25, 2008	3T7452	4.18
On Clark's first day at the Daily Planet, a bomb on a bus goes off outside the building. Chloe helps one of the injured passengers, Bette (Jessica Parker Kennedy), and meets paramedic Davis Bloome. Bette, a homeless teenager, stays with Chloe while Davis contacts a friend who runs a shelter for the homeless. Clark discovers that there was no bomb on the bus, but that someone blew it up with their meteor power. Clark and Lois deduce that Bette is the one with the meteor power, and Clark arrives at the Talon to save Chloe before Bette can hurt her. As Bette heads to Belle Reve, Tess stops by and persuades her to join a group of individuals, who also have meteor powers, that Tess has been forming. Chloe calls Davis to let him know she is reopening the Isis Foundation, while he lies naked in the street, awoken in pain.
155	3	"Toxic"	Mairzee Almas	Caroline Dries	October 2, 2008	3T7453	4.05
Oliver collapses at a fundraiser and reveals to Clark and Chloe that he has been poisoned and only has twelve hours to live. Chloe calls Davis, who attempts to find a cure for Oliver's ailment, while Clark tries to find out who is responsible. Tess assigns Lois the job of uncovering the truth about Oliver's "drunken fall" at the fundraiser. While unconscious, Oliver relives the time he was shipwrecked on an island and how he first learned to shoot a bow. He also relives his first meeting with Tess, who was kidnapped while doing marine research in Fiji by a man named Marcos (Ron Selmour). Clark manages to get an antidote for Oliver, who informs him that Tess will be attacked next. Clark saves Tess before Marcos, who has returned, can kill her. Tess gives Oliver information proving Lionel killed his parents, which upsets him even further when he learns Clark knew but could not be trusting enough to tell him. Tess later takes revenge and poisons Marcos before sending him to the hospital to die.
156	4	"Instinct"	James Conway	Al Septien & Turi Meyer	October 9, 2008	3T7454	4.12
Tess and Dr. Edward Groll (Bill Mondy) activate the crystal that built the Fortress, which results in an energy beam being sent into space. An alien, Maxima (Charlotte Sullivan), from the planet Almerac, recognizes the beacon as Kryptonian and comes to Earth to search for the Kryptonian she believes sent for her. Maxima tracks the signal to Tess, and then mistakenly identifies Jimmy as the Kryptonian. Maxima's kiss almost kills Jimmy, but Clark comes to the rescue. Maxima realizes Clark is the Kryptonian she has been looking for and uses her hormone-enhanced kiss to take control over Clark. When Clark tries to comfort Lois, who witnesses the pair kissing, Maxima assumes she is a rival mate and attempts to kill her. Clark stops Maxima and uses her bracelet to send her back to her home planet. He also learns that Tess has his crystal, but the crystal is stolen and Tess later receives an email from someone named "X" letting her know she isn't ready for it yet.
157	5	"Committed"	Glen Winter	Bryan Q. Miller	October 16, 2008	3T7455	4.18
Chloe and Jimmy are kidnapped after their engagement party by a jeweler named Macy (David Lewis) who wants to test their love. Using a lie-detector to quiz them, every time one is caught in a lie, the other is punished with a surge of electricity. Clark and Lois discover that they are missing and pose as a couple to lure the kidnapper out of hiding. Chloe and Jimmy survive, answering the questions to Macy's satisfaction, who sets them free. Lois is kidnapped by the jeweler. Clark goes to her rescue, but a kryptonite watch Macy wears weakens Clark. During the line of questions, Lois admits that she loves Clark. Before Clark can answer, he manages to strip the watch off Macy and then knock him unconscious. Later, Lois chalks up her "love" for Clark as nothing more than a lie, which she was able to accomplish by slipping the lie-detector electrode off her finger.
158	6	"Prey"	Michael Rohl	Kelly Souders & Brian Peterson	October 23, 2008	3T7456	4.16
A serial killer attacks a local club, injuring and murdering several patrons. Clark arrives and discovers Davis's body, covered in blood and lying unconscious on the floor. Davis denies any memory of the event. While looking for clues, Clark again encounters Martian Manhunter, who, since losing his powers, has taken a job as police detective John Jones. John and Clark work together on the attack, with John indicating that there have been others and that Davis has been the first to arrive on each of the scenes. Davis discovers that the blood on his body is not his, and that he has no wounds; Davis starts to believe that he is the killer because he suffers blackouts during the attacks, and finds his skin under the fingernail of a victim. A client of Chloe's named Randy Klein (Tyler Johnston) attacks Davis and Jimmy with his shadow form, and after Clark subdues him, the client confesses to all of the murders. John warns Clark that his heroic actions are getting a lot of attention and could expose him to the world, so he needs to be more careful when saving people. Randy, who was lying about being responsible for the murders, is later approached by Tess's assistant Eva Greer (Anna Williams) who offers him a chance to be part of a team.
159	7	"Identity"	Mairzee Almas	Todd Slavkin & Darren Swimmer	October 30, 2008	3T7457	4.32
Lois and Jimmy are mugged on the street, and when Jimmy attempts to snap a picture of the mugger he catches a blurred image of Clark saving Lois. Jimmy goes on the hunt to identify the mysterious "Good Samaritan", and Chloe tells Clark that he should use this opportunity to create an alter ego for himself like Oliver has with Green Arrow. Tess plants a new reporter named Sebastian Kane (Kyle Schmid) at the Daily Planet, who has the ability to steal memories, to find out if Lois stole the crystal. Jimmy's research leads him right to Clark. Having Oliver pose as the Good Samaritan, Clark sets up a scheme and shows Jimmy that he is wrong. Sebastian attempts to kill Lois after discovering that she knows who he is, but Clark intervenes. Lois vows to uncover the identity of the Good Samaritan and Clark realizes his destiny might be to give people hope. Chloe visits Sebastian, and when she learns that he knows Clark's secret, she uses her abilities to render him catatonic.
160	8	"Bloodline"	Michael Rohl	Caroline Dries	November 6, 2008	3T7459	4.46
Someone sends Clark the crystal to rebuild the Fortress. When Clark touches the crystal, it activates and sends him and Lois to the Phantom Zone. There, Clark and Lois find Kara (Laura Vandervoort), who helps Lois escape back to Earth, but General Zod's wife Faora also escapes and takes over Lois's body. Faora sets out to find her son, who turns out to be Davis – Faora explains that he was created when Faora and Zod could not have children. When Davis does not recognize her, Faora kills him, promising to make him stronger. Chloe uses her powers to bring Clark and Kara back to Earth, with Kara getting John's crystal to exorcise Faora from Lois's body. Tess pieces together that Clark was in the Arctic with Lex when he disappeared, while Kara decides to leave Earth in search of Kandor, a city that could possibly house survivors of Krypton. Davis awakens, now with indestructible skin.
161	9	"Abyss"	Kevin G. Fair	Don Whitehead & Holly Henderson	November 13, 2008	3T7458	3.56
Chloe's memories begin rapidly disappearing, as Brainiac replaces them with Kryptonian code, with the symbol for "Doom" appearing repeatedly. After Chloe forgets everyone, except Davis, Clark decides he has to use the crystal to rebuild the Fortress and have Jor-El (voiced by Terence Stamp) restore her memories. Clark then makes a sole provision, that all of Chloe's knowledge about Clark's true identity be removed. As Jor-El restores her memories, Brainiac leaves Chloe and infects the Fortress, unknown to Clark. With her memories restored, Chloe continues planning her wedding with Jimmy. Davis visits Chloe and confesses his love for her, and that he believes she is marrying the wrong man.
162	10	"Bride"	Jeannot Szwarc	Al Septien & Turi Meyer	November 20, 2008	3T7460	4.19
While Lois organizes Jimmy and Chloe's wedding, Oliver shows up on the Kent farm and informs Clark that Lex is still alive, but he needs Clark's help to find Lex's exact location. Clark declines his immediate assistance, explaining that Chloe no longer knows his secret and would never understand why he could not give her away at her wedding. Traveling to Cuba, Oliver meets Lana (Kristin Kreuk), who has also been following Lex's trail. Oliver convinces Lana to come back to Smallville, and she arrives at the wedding interrupting Clark and Lois just as they are about to kiss. A security guard discovers Davis disposing of evidence, but before he can call the police, Davis morphs into a Kryptonian monster and kills him. The monster arrives at the ceremony, where he critically injures Jimmy and kidnaps Chloe. He then takes Chloe to the Fortress. Lois decides to leave Smallville to help Jimmy although her real reason is the arrival of Lana and leaves heartbroken.
163	11	"Legion"	Glen Winter	Geoff Johns	January 15, 2009	3T7461	4.30
Clark is attacked by Persuader (Fraser Aitcheson) in his barn, but he is saved by a trio of superpowered aliens from the 31st Century, called the Legion, consisting of Rokk (Ryan Kennedy), Imra (Alexz Johnson), and Garth (Calum Worthy). While inhabiting Chloe's body, Brainiac informs Davis that he will soon become the creature "Doomsday" permanently, and places him in an ice cocoon for the metamorphosis. The Legion members inform Clark that he is supposed to destroy Brainiac for good, but the only way for him to do that would be to kill Chloe. Brainiac begins sucking the knowledge from every human mind through the world's computer network when he is attacked by the Legion. Before the Legion can kill Chloe, Clark intervenes and convinces them to focus their powers and pull Brainiac out of Chloe, who regains her memories of Clark's secret. Afterward, the Legion takes what is left of Brainiac with them back to the future to reprogram him into Brainiac 5, leaving Clark with a Legion ring of his own.
164	12	"Bulletproof"	Morgan Beggs	Bryan Miller	January 22, 2009	3T7462	3.85
John is shot by an unseen assailant while on duty, and Chloe and Clark suspect that the shooter was another police officer. Clark goes undercover as a cop to identify the shooter. Clark discovers that a group of officers are taking the law into their own hands and killing criminals. The group realize who Clark really is and frame him for John's attempted murder. Believing that Green Arrow is on to them, the cops attempt to kill him, as well. Luckily, Clark's words of encouragement persuade one of the cops, Dan Turpin (David Paetkau), to turn on his companions Joe Simmons (Jim Thorburton) and Talbert (Ty Olsson). With some help from John, who has recovered, Clark is cleared of all charges while Simmons and Talbert are arrested. Lana informs Tess that Lex inserted a nano-transmitter into her optic nerve so that he could keep an eye on everything she was doing. As retribution, Tess offers Oliver the chance to buy LuthorCorp.
165	13	"Power"	Allison Mack	Todd Slavkin & Darren Swimmer	January 29, 2009	3T7463	4.21
Believing that Lana has been kidnapped, Tess tells Clark that she believes Lex took her. She also informs Clark that the reason Lana left after coming out of her coma was because Lex had her taken into custody when she woke, and forced her to break up with Clark via a video. After Clark talks with Chloe, he realizes that Lana never returned because she was busy plotting her revenge against Lex. Clark and Chloe discover that Lana was not kidnapped, but intends to use Lex's "Prometheus" technology, which harnesses alien DNA to give an individual super-human abilities, on herself. It is a success and Lana is imbued with super-powers of her own. She tells Clark that he no longer has to worry about her and that they can work together to make the world a better place.
166	14	"Requiem"	Michael Rohl	Don Whitehead & Holly Henderson	February 5, 2009	3T7464	3.93
Just as Oliver is announcing to the LuthorCorp board of executives that Queen Industries has bought controlling interest in LuthorCorp, a bomb detonates in the meeting room. Clark and Lana investigate the bombing and discover that the bomb was made with kryptonite. Lana also discovers that her suit not only gives her strength and speed, but absorbs kryptonite radiation as well. The bombmaker, Winslow Schott (Chris Gauthier), a former Queen Industries employee now under employ of Lex (portrayed by Kevin Miller and voiced by Matt Adler), plants another bomb on the roof of the Daily Planet. When Lana absorbs the kryptonite in this bomb to deactivate it, she becomes so irradiated that she and Clark can never again be near each other. Clark tracks Lex down, but Lana stops him from doing something he would regret, and Lex's mobile safe-house explodes and kills him. To keep from harming Clark, Lana leaves Smallville again. Chloe discovers Oliver was the one who exploded Lex's safe-house.
167	15	"Infamous"	Glen Winter	Caroline Dries	March 12, 2009	3T7465	3.57
Lois returns to Smallville and is not happy to see Clark. Linda Lake (Tori Spelling) comes back and threatens to expose Clark's secret if he does not agree to provide her with the inside scoop on all of the "Red-Blue Blur" heroics he performs. Instead, Clark has Lois write his story as a means of controlling the inevitable. In response, Linda announces that Clark is part of an alien invasion and that he killed Lex. With the police after him, Clark uses his Legion ring to go back in time and stops Linda from writing her story. Clark destroys the ring afterward. Davis begins taking antipsychotic medication to keep his alien side from coming out and visits Linda, who will be taken to Belle Reve. When Linda tries to bring out Doomsday in an effort to escape, Davis keeps the creature from coming by smothering her with a pillow.
168	16	"Turbulence"	Kevin G. Fair	Al Septien & Turi Meyer	March 19, 2009	3T7466	3.49
Clark begins to embrace the idea of a double identity by wearing his blue shirt under his suit, carrying his red jacket in his backpack, and switching into his Red-Blue Blur persona whenever he needs to. Tess orchestrates an elaborate plan to expose Clark's secret, which involves stranding the two of them on a plane on the verge of crashing. Clark manages to get the two to safety without Tess seeing him use his powers. Meanwhile, Jimmy witnesses Davis murdering a man in the hospital, but Davis drugs Jimmy with a hallucinogen to make it appear that he is delusional. After witnessing Chloe and Davis hugging and having Chloe stun him with a taser before he could hit Davis with a pipe, Jimmy informs Chloe that marrying her was a mistake and he walks out on her.
169	17	"Hex"	Mairzee Almas	Bryan Miller	March 26, 2009	3T7467	3.80
A magician named Zatanna (Serinda Swan) grants Chloe's wish to have Lois's life, and as a result Chloe wakes up with Lois's body. Chloe informs Clark about what has happened and the pair track down Zatanna. Chloe learns that to reverse the spell she has to not want the wish any longer; at the same time, Clark inadvertently wishes to have a normal life, which deprives him of the knowledge of his abilities. Zatanna visits Oliver and offers to grant him one wish if he can find her father's book of spells. Oliver gets the book and Zatanna sets out to resurrect her father Zatara with it, which will require her to sacrifice her own life. Clark regains the memory of his alien heritage with help from Chloe and convinces Zatanna not to sacrifice herself but instead use her gifts to honor her father's memory.
170	18	"Eternal"	James Marshall	Brian Peterson & Kelly Souders	April 2, 2009	3T7468	3.85
After doing some research, Tess informs Davis that he crash landed to Earth in 1989, during the Smallville meteor shower, alongside another boy. She tells Davis that he and Clark are destined to fight and kill each other, and that Clark cannot accept his role as Earth's savior until he kills Davis. Davis remembers that he was hurt by kryptonite as a child, and has Chloe lock him in a tank and drown him in a kryptonite solution until he dies. Tess tries to convince Clark that she knows who he is, and her theory about his needing to kill Davis, but she fails. In the end, Davis returns to life and is now immune to kryptonite; he informs Chloe that her presence is the only thing that keeps Doomsday at bay. It is also revealed that Tess is in possession of the Kryptonian orb that took Clark's powers.
171	19	"Stiletto"	Kevin G. Fair	Caroline Dries	April 23, 2009	3T7469	3.10
After saving Chloe from a carjacker, who turns out to be local mobster Bruno Mannheim (Dominic Zamprogna), Lois takes on the superhero persona of "Stiletto" which she uses to get closer to the Red-Blue Blur and convince him to give an interview to herself. Jimmy is enlisted to take photos of Lois in her Stiletto costume, but his camera is taken by the mobster who wants revenge on her. Clark goes looking for Stiletto in an effort to track down Chloe's laptop that contains files on Oliver and his team, and discovers that Lois is Stiletto. After lecturing her on faking a story, he tracks down the laptop but is incapacitated by kryptonite used in the money counterfeiting operation. Lois arrives just in time to save Clark and Jimmy. In the end, Lois receives a call from the Red-Blue Blur who informs her that she does not need to fake stories to be a good reporter, and when he is ready to come out to the world she will be the first to know.
172	20	"Beast"	Michael Rohl	Genevieve Sparling	April 30, 2009	3T7470	3.23
Clark begins to suspect that Davis is alive and when the Metropolis police issue a manhunt for Davis, whom they believe to be a local serial killer, Chloe decides it would be best if they both just left Smallville. Clark informs Chloe that he can send Davis to the Phantom Zone using the crystal from the Fortress. Hearing this, Chloe lies and tells Clark she thinks Davis could be in Alaska. Clark finds Davis in the process of killing Oliver, but he intervenes and takes Davis to the Fortress. Clark uses the crystal to open the Phantom Zone, but Chloe arrives, removes the crystal, and chastises Clark for giving up on Davis. Chloe and Davis leave the Fortress, going off the grid so that Clark and Oliver can not track them.
173	21	"Injustice"	Tom Welling	Al Septien & Turi Meyer	May 7, 2009	3T7471	3.39
Tess gathers a team of meteor-infected individuals consisting of Bette / Plastique, Eva Greer, Parasite (Brendan Fletcher), Livewire (Anna Mae Routledge), and Neutron (Jae Lee) to track Doomsday so that she can give Clark his location, and hopefully convince him to kill Doomsday. Neutron is killed by Doomsday and Livewire has her powers stolen by Parasite before being killed offscreen by Tess. Eva pretends to be Chloe in order to trick Clark into killing Doomsday. After Eva's death, Plastique and Parasite fry the chips in their head and go after Tess only to be defeated by Clark and Oliver. Tess later learns that Clark plans to use black kryptonite to split Davis from his Doomsday persona and send the beast into the Phantom Zone. As a result, Tess steals the crystal that opens the Phantom Zone and destroys it, all at the request from a disembodied voice claiming to be from Kandor that emanates from the Kryptonian orb she has. Tess informs Clark that now he has no choice but to kill Doomsday. Meanwhile, Oliver confesses to Clark that he killed Lex, which forces Clark to question who Oliver has become if he is willing to take another man's life.
174	22	"Doomsday"	James Marshall	Brian Peterson & Kelly Souders	May 14, 2009	3T7472	3.13
Rokk returns from the 31st Century and informs Clark that Doomsday will kill him and gives him a new Legion ring to transport Doomsday to the future. Instead, Clark decides to use black kryptonite to split Davis from Doomsday and bury the beast a mile underground. Tess confronts Lois about stealing the Kryptonian orb. As the two fight, Lois finds the Legion ring and is transported to another time in history. When Davis starts to change, Chloe uses the black kryptonite to split him herself. Clark battles Doomsday in the streets of Metropolis and manages to bury Doomsday as planned using explosives to seal the tunnel, with help from Oliver, Dinah, and Bart Allen (Kyle Gallner). Davis stabs Jimmy when he realizes that Chloe still loves Jimmy. Before he dies, Jimmy impales Davis on a metal rod resulting in a mutual kill. Clark tells Chloe that it is human-learned emotions that have caused him the most trouble, and vows that "Clark Kent is dead". The orb returns to Tess and releases Zod.

== Cast and characters ==
=== Main ===
- Tom Welling as Clark Kent / The Red-Blue Blur
- Allison Mack as Chloe Sullivan
- Erica Durance as Lois Lane (Note: Absent in ten episodes)
- Aaron Ashmore as Jimmy Olsen (Note: Absent in 11 episodes)
- Cassidy Freeman as Tess Mercer (Note: Absent in nine episodes)
- Sam Witwer as Davis Bloome
  - Witwer also portrays Zod in "Doomsday"
- Justin Hartley as Oliver Queen / Green Arrow

=== Recurring ===
- Mike Dopud as George
- Anna Williams as Eva Greer
- Kristin Kreuk as Lana Lang
- Dario Delacio as Doomsday

== Production ==
=== Writing ===
Executive producer Kelly Souders explained that the loss of developers Alfred Gough and Miles Millar, as well as series regulars Michael Rosenbaum and Kristin Kreuk at the end of the seventh season, forced the creative team to look at the series from a new angle. As Souders explained, it allowed the writers to work with "blank slates", and come up with ways to "reinvigorate and reinvent the show". Executive producer Darren Swimmer explained that this season features Chloe Sullivan's powers manifesting in a way that they have not previously been seen. He went on to express that the theme of season eight is "double identity"; specifically, Swimmer explained that Clark Kent would begin to understand that he is going to have to live a double life, or he will never be able to continue forward with his destiny. Season eight is about Clark moving forward to his destiny in a way that the show has never attempted before. Swimmer further explained that Clark is acting more with his superpowers, whereas previously he would "react" to the situation; "he's going to seek out trouble". Clark joined the Daily Planet to help his cause, using the Planet as a means to get information about where there is trouble. Clark's heroic actions put him in Jimmy Olsen's sights, who starts connecting things to Clark; this helped fuel Clark's decision to develop a "secret identity". Another reason for Clark's decision to develop a secret identity was the stark contrast between saving people in the secluded streets of Smallville and saving people in the crowded streets of Metropolis. While working at the Daily Planet, Clark was paired up with Lois Lane on various assignments. Lois actress Erica Durance explained the episodes focused more on her character than they have been in the past, and that Lois and Clark are both rivals and supportive partners to each other. Durance also revealed that Lois begins to realize her true romantic feelings for Clark, but that she does not want him to know the truth because she does not know what she wants to do with those feelings. Season eight explored these romantic notions between the two characters. Jeph Loeb added at the time that season eight explores more of the DC Comics mythology, and introduces new characters, as well as expanding on already existing ones in the Smallville continuity. Executive producer Brian Peterson also revealed that there was a chance that the series would break the "No flights, no tights" rule, at least in regard to the flying part of the rule.

With Justin Hartley promoted to a series regular, Smallville explored more of his character Oliver Queen's backstory, including why he chose to become Green Arrow, how he accomplished it, and how he became good at archery. This season also explored more of the friendship between Oliver and Clark. Oliver would be broken down emotionally—questioning whether he made the right choice to sacrifice all for the sake of being Green Arrow—and that causes him to "butt heads" with Clark, who is beginning to embrace his destiny. Chloe has more romantic interests in this season. Not only would the character still have Jimmy, but there is still the question of her romantic interest in Clark, as well as a new interest in the character of Davis Bloome. She would also be picking up the Isis Foundation, a counseling center for people infected by kryptonite, that Lana Lang founded before she left Smallville. Mack explained that Chloe was forging her own destiny in this season, and letting Clark learn to deal with problems on his own—previous seasons saw Clark relying heavily on Chloe to help solve the crime.

=== Characters ===
Peterson and Todd Slavkin introduced more DC Comics characters into Smallville this season. Among those appearing were Plastique and Maxima, the latter coming to Smallville to try to mate with Clark. This version of Maxima had the ability to make herself irresistible to men, including Clark, whom she set her sights on; Charlotte Sullivan was cast in the role. Smallville also introduced the futuristic heroes from the Legion of Super-Heroes. Comic book scribe Geoff Johns wrote the episode that featured the Legion, and suggested that people familiar with the Legion would recognize them when they appeared on the series, as they had some of the quintessential elements of their comic book counterparts. Saturn Girl, Cosmic Boy, and Lightning Lad appeared in this episode. In the seventeenth episode, "Hex", Smallville puts its spin on the DC character Zatanna. Portrayed by Serinda Swan, Zatanna is a magician who comes to town and grants Chloe a birthday wish that results in Chloe's body transforming into Lois. In an interview, writer Bryan Q. Miller explained that he read through archived comics featuring the Zatanna character, but was more influenced by Grant Morrison's writing turn on Seven Soldiers (2005–2006), as well as the television episodes of Batman: The Animated Series (1992–1995) and Justice League Unlimited (2004–2006) that Zatanna made appearances on. Swan won the role of Zatanna after "acing" her audition thanks to the actress recording Zatanna's spells into her iPod and studying them in reverse—to cast a spell, Zatanna recites the words in reverse.

There were two new characters added to the series as series regulars, Tess Mercer (Cassidy Freeman) and Davis Bloome (Sam Witwer). The name "Tess Mercer" is a homage to two characters from the Superman lore, Eve Teschmacher and Mercy Graves. As Freeman described her character, Tess is Lex Luthor's handpicked successor; she is "fierce", "fun" and intelligent. Tess's primary goal for this season was finding Lex, which drew her inquisitively to Clark, who she believed would be able to help her. Swimmer revealed that Tess develops a romantic interest in Clark as well. Davis would actually be Smallville's interpretation of Doomsday, the only character to have succeeded at killing Superman in the comics. In Smallville, Doomsday was represented by a "nice guy" paramedic, who grew up moving from foster home to foster home. His storyline was very dark in that the character would uncover horrible truths about himself. Witwer explained that over the course of the season, his character would come to resemble that of the comic book counterpart he is based on. Peterson explained that the new executive producers were looking for a villainous character that was "as great as Lex" after Rosenbaum's departure, and Doomsday fit what they were looking for.

== Reception ==
Season eight finished 152 out of the 190 shows ranked in the Nielsen ratings, averaging 3.74 million viewers a week. Smallville's eighth season received an Emmy Award nomination in the Sound Editing for a Series category. In the 2009 Teen Choice Awards, Welling received the award for Choice TV Actor – Action Adventure.

The season eight DVD box set was officially released on August 25, 2009, and sold approximately 183,000 units in its first week; it generated an estimated $6.7 million. Comparatively, the DVD revenue decreased from the previous year, with the season seven box set having sold over 212,000 units and generating an estimated $8 million during its first week. Regardless, it was enough for Smallville to earn second place in most units sold during the ending week of August 30, 2009, just behind the season five boxset of House which sold approximately 223,000 units. Even though House sold more units, Smallville's $6.7 million in revenue was more than House's $6.0 million, making it the top money earner for the week. In its second week, the eighth season sold 55,000 units, and earning more than $2 million. The third week of release saw another dip in sales, with the season eight boxset selling 30,000 units. At the same time, the end of week three brought the season eight sales past the $10 million mark.

== Home media release ==
The complete eighth season of Smallville was released on August 25, 2009, in North America in both DVD and Blu-ray format. The DVD and Blu-ray box set were also released in region 2 and region 4 on October 12, 2009, and March 31, 2010, respectively. The box set included various special features, including episode commentary, a behind-the-scenes featurettes titled "Smallville's Doomsday: The Making of a Monster" and "In the Director's Chair: Behind the Lens and Calling the Shots with Allison Mack".
