= Bryan Q. Miller =

American television and comic writer

Bryan Q. Miller is an American television and comic writer most notable for his work on the CW’s television series Smallville and DC’s comic book Batgirl.

== Career ==
Miller began work on Smallville as an unpaid intern during Season Five, a job he held for two seasons before being hired as a Writers’ Assistant in Season Seven. After completing the WB Writers’ Workshop, he was promoted to Staff Writer for Season Eight. Before the show ended, he served as the show’s Executive Story Editor.

Through his work on Smallville, Miller met comic writer Geoff Johns, who introduced Miller to editors at DC Comics. Through these meetings, Miller landed a three-book arc for Teen Titans in 2009.

From October 2009 to July 2011, he wrote the re-launched Batgirl book, featuring Stephanie Brown as the cowl-wearing superhero. The series met critical acclaim. He went on to write the Smallville Season 11 comic book series.

He is among the authors contributing to Pirates of the Caribbean: Six Sea Chanties, a graphic novel anthology that will serve as a prequel to Pirates of the Caribbean: On Stranger Tides. It was expected to be published on April 19, 2011, though was held back due to the production not being satisfied with the final product. Its current fate is currently unknown.

Miller also published a Kickstarter-funded graphic novel, titled Earthward, with Marcio Takara producing the artwork.

== Personal life ==
Miller is married to Syfy Vice President of Original Programming and Development Erika Kennair.

== Screenwriting ==
- series head writer denoted in bold

=== Television ===
- Smallville (2008-2011)
- Arrow (2013-2014)
- Dominion (2014)
- Defiance (2014-2015)
- The Flash (2016)
- Guilt (2016)
- Sleepy Hollow (2017)
- Shadowhunters (2017-2019)
- Motherland: Fort Salem (2021)
- **He-Man and the Masters of the Universe** (2021-2022)

=== Film ===
- Justice League vs. Teen Titans (2016)

== Producer ==
=== Television ===
- Dominion (2014)
- Defiance (2014): co-producer
- Guilt (2016): supervising producer
- Sleepy Hollow (2017): co-executive producer
- Shadowhunters (2017-2019)
  - consulting producer (2017)
  - co-executive producer (2018-2019)
- Motherland: Fort Salem (2021): executive producer

== Bibliography ==
=== DC Comics ===
- Teen Titans vol. 3 (August, 2009-October, 2009)
  - "Child's Play" (with Joe Bennett, in #72-74, collected in Child's Play, tpb, 208 pages, 2010, ISBN 1-4012-2641-8)
- Batgirl vol. 3 (October, 2009-October, 2011)
  - Volume 1: Batgirl Rising (tpb, 168 pages, 2010, ISBN 1-4012-2723-6) collects:
    - "Batgirl Rising: Point of New Origin" (with Lee Garbett and Trevor Scott, in #1-3, 2009)
    - "Batgirl Rising: Field Test" (with Lee Garbett and Trevor Scott, in #4, 2010)
    - "Batgirl Rising: Core Requirements" (with Lee Garbett and Trevor Scott, in #5-7, 2010)
  - "Batgirl Rising: Robins are Red..." (with Talent Caldwell, in #8, 2010, collected in Red Robin: Collision, tpb, ISBN 1-4012-2883-6)
  - Volume 2: The Flood (tpb, 144 pages, 2011, ISBN 1-4012-3142-X) collects:
    - "The Flood" (with Lee Garbett and Pere Pérez, #9-12, 2010)
    - "Trust" (with Pere Pérez, #13, 2010)
    - "Terror in the Third Dimension" (with Lee Garbett and Trevor Scott, #14, 2010)
  - Volume 3: The Lesson (tpb, 224 pages, 2011, ISBN 1-4012-3270-1) collects:
    - "The Lesson: Grass Before the Scythe" (with Dustin Nguyen, in #15-16, 2011)
    - "The Lesson: Frogs, Snails & Puppy-Dog Tails..." (with Pere Pérez, in #17, 2011)
    - "Chalk (heart) Outline" (with Dustin Nguyen, in #18, 2011)
    - "The Lesson: Tunnel Vision" (with Ramon Bachs, in #19-20, 2011)
    - "The Lesson: Unchained Melody" (with Dustin Nguyen, in #21, 2011)
    - "Five Minutes Fast" (with Pere Pérez, in #22, 2011)
  - "Here Endeth the Lesson" (with Pere Pérez, in #23, 2011)
  - "Unsinkable" (with Pere Pérez, in #24, 2011)
- DC Universe Halloween Special 2010, "Medusa Non Grata", (with Trevor McCarthy, December, 2010)
- Smallville Season 11 (July, 2012-January 2014)
  - Volume 1: Guardian (tpb, 144 pages, 2013, ISBN 1-4012-3824-6) collects:
    - "Guardian" (with Pere Pérez, in #1-4, 2012)
  - Volume 2: Detective (tpb, 144 pages, 2013, ISBN 1-4012-4094-1) collects:
    - "Detective" (with ChrisCross, Jamal Igle and Kevin West, in #5-8, 2012-2013)
  - Volume 3: Haunted (tpb, 144 pages, 2013, ISBN 1-4012-4291-X) collects:
    - "Haunted" (with Jorge Jiménez, in #9-12, 2013)
  - Volume 4: Argo (tpb, 160 pages, 2014, 1-4012-4637-0) collects:
    - "Argo" (with Daniel HDR, #13-15, 2013)
    - "Valkyrie" (with Cat Staggs, in Smallville Season 11 Special #2, 2013)
  - Volume 5: Olympus (tpb, 160 pages, 2014, 1-4012-4637-0) collects:
    - "Olympus" (with Jorge Jiménez, #16-19, 2013)
- Smallville Season 11: Alien (miniseries) (with Edgar Salazar, in #1-4, February, 2014-May, 2014)
- Smallville: Lantern (miniseries) (with Marcio Takara and Ig Guara, in #1-4, June, 2014-September, 2014)

Preceded by Sean McKeever	Teen Titans writer 2009	Succeeded by Felicia D. Henderson
Preceded by Adam Beechen	Batgirl writer 2009-2011	Succeeded by Gail Simone
