= Smallville season 3 =

Season of television series

Smallville
- Season 3
- DVD cover featuring Kristin Kreuk, Michael Rosenbaum, and Tom Welling
- Showrunners: Alfred Gough; Miles Millar
- Starring: Tom Welling; Kristin Kreuk; Michael Rosenbaum; Sam Jones III; Allison Mack; John Glover; Annette O'Toole; John Schneider
- No. of episodes: 22

Release
- Original network: The WB
- Original release: October 1, 2003 – May 19, 2004

Season chronology
- ← Previous; Season 2 Next → Season 4

The third season of Smallville, an American television series developed by Alfred Gough and Miles Millar, began airing on October 1, 2003, on The WB television network. The series recounts the early adventures of Kryptonian Clark Kent as he adjusts to life in the fictional town of Smallville, Kansas, in the years before he becomes Superman. The third season comprises 22 episodes and concluded its initial airing on May 19, 2004. Regular cast members during season three include Tom Welling, Kristin Kreuk, Michael Rosenbaum, Sam Jones III, Allison Mack, John Glover, Annette O'Toole, and John Schneider.

Season three follows Clark's (Welling) constant fight against the destiny that his biological father, Jor-El, has in-store for him, and his guilt over the price Jonathan (Schneider) paid to bring him back to Smallville. Lex Luthor (Rosenbaum) deals with the psychological breakdown he had when stranded on a deserted island, while the conflict between him and his father Lionel (Glover) comes to a final blow. Clark's secret begins to weigh heavily on Pete Ross (Jones III), and the relationship between Clark and Lana Lang (Kreuk) hits a dead end. Writers also brought in several DC Comics characters, including Maggie Sawyer, Morgan Edge, and most notably Perry White, in special guests spots.

After spending its first two seasons airing on Tuesdays at 9:00 pm (ET), Smallville was moved to Wednesdays and aired at 8:00 pm for the third season. Season three dipped in the ratings, averaging 4.9 million viewers a week.

== Episodes ==
No. overall	No. in season	Title	Directed by	Written by	Original release date	Prod. code	U.S. viewers (millions)
45	1	"Exile"	Greg Beeman	Alfred Gough & Miles Millar	October 1, 2003	176201	6.82
Under the influence of red kryptonite, and living in Metropolis, Clark gets involved with a crime lord named Morgan Edge (Rutger Hauer) who hires him to break into LuthorCorp. Through help from Chloe, Lana is able to find Clark and tips the Kents off to his location. Desperate to put his family back together, Jonathan makes a deal with Jor-El (voiced by Terence Stamp) so that he can bring Clark home. Lex is stranded on a deserted island, battling a hallucinatory manifestation of his insecurities, with the world believing him to be dead. At the mansion, Lionel accuses Helen (Emmanuelle Vaugier), revealed to be alive, of killing Lex.
46	2	"Phoenix"	James Marshall	Kelly Souders & Brian Peterson	October 8, 2003	176202	6.74
Jor-El grants Jonathan temporary superpowers, and he and Clark engage in a destructive battle below the LuthorCorp building. Clark, unable to kill his father, destroys the red kryptonite. Lex returns home to the shock of Helen. He quickly learns that Helen attempted to kill him and takes measures to ensure that doesn't happen again. Edge finds Clark and kidnaps him in an effort to make amends to Lionel, but the plan fails and Edge and his henchmen are killed.
47	3	"Extinction"	Michael Katleman	Todd Slavkin & Darren Swimmer	October 15, 2003	176203	6.47
Clark discovers Van McNulty (Jesse Metcalfe) has been killing green meteor rock-infected people. When Clark confronts him, the green kryptonite rock Van is carrying stops him. Knowing Clark's weakness, Van manufactures kryptonite bullets and almost kills Clark. Using Lana as bait, Van tries to increase his efforts, but both Lana and Clark prove to be too much for him to handle. Van is later taken to the Belle Reve sanitarium.
48	4	"Slumber"	Terrence O'Hara	Drew Z. Greenberg	October 22, 2003	176204	6.92
A comatose girl, Sarah Conroy (Katharine Isabelle), has the ability to pull Clark into her dreams and does so without warning. Clark and Lana visit her and grow suspicious of her uncle Nicholas (Christopher Shyer) when they learn of Sarah's inheritance that he oversees. They discover the uncle has been drugging her to keep her in a coma with his will appearing in Sarah's dreams as the Traveler (performed by John DeSantis). When Nicholas finds out, he tries to kill Lana, but Clark arrives in time to stop him.
49	5	"Perry"	Jeannot Szwarc	Mark Verheiden	October 29, 2003	176205	6.71
Clark discovers his abilities are derived from the Sun, when an increase in solar flares cause his powers to either flare up, or give out completely. Perry White (Michael McKean), a once promising journalist, arrives in Smallville in search of stories for a tabloid news show. Despite being constantly inebriated, Perry believes he witnessed Clark using superhuman abilities, and devises a dangerous scheme to expose the truth.
50	6	"Relic"	Marita Grabiak	Kelly Souders & Brian Peterson	November 5, 2003	176206	6.72
Lana's great uncle Dex McCallum (Tom Heaton), who was convicted of murdering his wife forty years prior, shows her a picture of a drifter he believes really killed her aunt. The drifter looks just like Clark. Positive that the man is Jor-El, Clark's investigation leads him to a Kryptonian medallion that allows him to see moments of the past, and also lets him see how human Jor-El (Welling in a dual role) was when he first came to Earth. It also gives him the knowledge that Dex was framed by his former friend Deputy William Tate (William B. Davis) who was collaborating with Lachlan Luthor. Clark gets Tate to confess to Sheriff Nancy Adams (Camille Mitchell) and Dex is cleared of all charges.
51	7	"Magnetic"	David Jackson	Holly Harold	November 12, 2003	176207	6.87
When Lana starts seeing a new guy named Seth Nelson (Kevin Zegers) and begins acting out of character, Clark investigates. Clark's suspicions are confirmed when he discovers Seth has magnetic powers that can move objects and alter human emotions. When he tries to free Lana from the magnetic hold, she tries to kill Clark. Lex discovers Chloe has been digging into Lionel's past and tries to get her to join him in his fight against his father.
52	8	"Shattered"	Ken Biller	Ken Biller	November 19, 2003	176208	6.36
Lex locates Edge (now portrayed by Patrick Bergin) who underwent plastic surgery and gets him to admit that he helped Lionel murder his parents. Before Lex can take it to the authorities, someone tries to kill him. Lex flees and asks Clark for help. Evidence begins to amount that suggests Lex has had a psychotic break. Lex watches Clark slam into Edge's car, after Clark pushes him out of harm's way. Lex's doctors arrive and take him to Belle Reve.
53	9	"Asylum"	Greg Beeman	Todd Slavkin & Darren Swimmer	January 14, 2004	176209	5.61
Lex attempts to convince Clark to help him escape, but when Clark refuses, he attempts to escape by himself. His resulting capture forces Lionel to send him in for electroshock therapy to erase his memory. Ian Randall (Jonathan Taylor Thomas), Eric Summers (Shawn Ashmore), and Van band together in an attempt to steal Clark's powers and escape. They get the meteor rocks but Ian betrays Van and kills him with a barbell before Clark arrives. Meanwhile, at the hospital after a near fatal accident caused by Lex, Lana meets another patient named Adam Knight (Ian Somerhalder), who pushes her to fight the pain and finish her rehab. Lex then has his electroshock therapy and Ian helps Eric leech himself onto Clark, so he can get his powers, but after getting the powers he becomes rowdy and betrays Ian before Clark manages to stop him and get his powers back again.
54	10	"Whisper"	Tom Wright	Ken Horton	January 21, 2004	176210	5.09
Attempting to stop a robbery, Clark is temporarily blinded when he shoots off a burst of heat vision that is reflected back into his eyes by a piece of green kryptonite during a conflict with thieves Walt Masterson (Walt MacDonald) and his sonic-screaming apprentice Nathan Dean (Micah Alberti). He soon realizes that his body has developed super-hearing to compensate for his lack of sight. Pete is kidnapped by Nathan in an attempt to blackmail Judge Abigail Ross into dismissing the charges against Walt. Clark tries to gain control over his hearing so that he can find Pete.
55	11	"Delete"	Pat Williams	Kelly Souders & Brian Peterson	January 28, 2004	176211	5.47
When Chloe uncovers a secret experiment at Summerholt Institute, someone begins sending mind-controlling emails to her friends with orders to kill her. Clark and Lex discover the person responsible named Molly Griggs (Missy Peregrym), but cannot tie her to Dr. Lawrence Garner (Martin Cummins). Lana decides to rent the apartment above the café to Adam, even though she feels he is hiding something dangerous about his past.
56	12	"Hereafter"	Greg Beeman & James Marshall	Mark Verheiden & Drew Greenberg	February 4, 2004	176212	5.31
Clark learns his schoolmate Jordan (Joseph Cross) can foresee the future death of anyone he touches. Jordan warns him that Lana is going to die in a fire in the next few days. Clark sets out to prevent Lana's death. Jordan also tells him that he didn't see a death in Clark's future. Chloe, suspicious of Adam, begins investigating him, and uncovers disturbing news.
57	13	"Velocity"	Jeannot Szwarc	Todd Slavkin & Darren Swimmer	February 11, 2004	176213	5.01
Pete begins street racing with kryptonite-infused cars where that fuel additive was created by Jason Dante (Ryan Merriman). When he refuses to throw a race, Jason threatens to kill him. Pete asks Clark to use his powers to help him and challenges Jason to a race. When Clark overhears their plan to blow up Pete's car, he tries to stop the race. Meanwhile, Jonathan begins to show the effects of his deal with Jor-El.
58	14	"Obsession"	James Marshall	Holly Harold	February 18, 2004	176214	5.33
When Clark is forced to use his powers in front of another student, Alicia Baker (Sarah Carter), he is surprised to find out she has powers of her own. The two develop a bond through their shared secret, but things change when Alicia becomes obsessive about sharing Clark with anyone else, especially Lana, who, fearing for her own safety, asks Lex to get rid of Adam.
59	15	"Resurrection"	Terrence O'Hara	Todd Slavkin & Darren Swimmer	February 25, 2004	176215	4.97
While his father awaits surgery, Clark befriends a teenage boy named Garrett Davis (James Kirk) whose brother Vince (Tahmoh Penikett) just died from liver failure. Everyone is shocked when Vince shows up at the Kents' alive. When his liver starts failing again, Garrett straps a kryptonite bomb to himself and demands that Vince be given Jonathan's liver or he will blow up the building. Clark learns that Lionel has been using a sample of his blood to bring the dead back to life. He tries to stop Garrett from doing any more damage but he hesitates. Garrett is finally killed when the police shoot him down.
60	16	"Crisis"	Ken Biller	Kelly Souders & Brian Peterson	March 3, 2004	176216	5.26
Clark receives a panicked call from Lana and hears a gunshot before the line goes dead, but when he arrives at the Talon he discovers she is alive and well. Clark, Chloe, and Lana realize the phone call came from one day into the future, and that Adam is the one who will shoot Lana. When Lex takes Clark to the LuthorCorp lab where Adam is being kept, he finds all of the staff murdered, and Adam missing. Adam then arrives at the Kent farm and knocks out Chloe and Jonathan and then kidnaps Lana before Clark follows Adam and Lana to the rugby grounds where Adam shoots Lana. Clark then arrives and finally stops Adam, who dies.
61	17	"Legacy"	Greg Beeman	Jeph Loeb	April 14, 2004	176217	4.48
Clark begins to suspect that Jor-El is sending Jonathan messages through the key, and that he is the cause for his father's withdrawal from the family. Clark goes down to the caves to confront his biological father. Lionel catches him there and begins putting the pieces together, which leads him to Dr. Virgil Swann (Christopher Reeve). A deal is struck and Lionel's true motives are revealed. Lana gives support and comfort to Clark, which leads to a kiss. Lana talks to Lex about losing faith in Clark and he gives questionable advice. Clark realizes that Swann met Lionel and then he and Jonathan go to the caves where Lionel and his crew is, Jonathan confronts Lionel and the two men get into a physical fight. A portal then opens before closing and Clark ends the fight by stopping his dad from strangling Lionel, the security then make a move on Clark and Jonathan, but Lionel stops them and realizes that the portal could be a key to the other world. The next morning, Jonathan tells Clark what he was doing with Jor-El in the Kawatche caves.
62	18	"Truth"	James Marshall	Drew Greenberg	April 21, 2004	176218	4.43
When Chloe accidentally inhales a mysterious kryptonite-gas, she discovers it acts as a truth serum to anyone who comes in contact with her. She decides to take advantage of her new power by attempting to uncover Clark's secret, but her new power comes with fatal consequences. Clark sets out to find an antidote before Chloe can discover the truth about him, rescuing her just when she is about to die.
63	19	"Memoria"	Miles Millar	Alfred Gough & Miles Millar	April 28, 2004	176219	4.32
Believing that key information about his father's past was lost when his memory was erased, Lex decides to join an experimental program with Garner to regain his memory. Knowing that Lex will discover his secret if he regains his memory, Clark tries to stop him, but is caught by Lionel and Garner so that they can experiment on him. Through the experiment, Clark learns about his birth mother. The experiment on Clark has a negative reaction that puts Garner into a coma.
64	20	"Talisman"	John Schneider	Ken Biller	May 5, 2004	176220	4.72
When a Kawatche Indian, Jeremiah Holdsclaw (Nathaniel Arcand), steals a mythic knife from the caves, he is bestowed with superpowers similar to Clark's. Believing he is the true Naman, he sets out to find and kill Lionel. Lionel attempts to find the knife, while Clark learns that it will crumble if the real Segeth touches it. Clark tries to find Jeremiah before he can kill Lionel.
65	21	"Forsaken"	Terrence O'Hara	Kelly Souders & Brian Peterson	May 12, 2004	176221	4.54
Emily Eve Dinsmore (Amber Rothwell) has grown-up and is still obsessed with Lana. She escapes from the institute where she is interned and kidnaps Lana. After learning that Lana is leaving Smallville, Clark decides to tell her his secret so they can finally be together. FBI agent Frank Loder (Gary Hudson) kidnaps and tortures Pete to try to force him to reveal Clark's secret, but Lex saves him. Pete then decided to move to Wichita with his mother to protect Clark's secret. Lex panics after the FBI gives him 24 hours to turn over information on his father or face jail time for the murders of the lab technicians at LuthorCorp. Chloe helps provide text of a conversation between her and Lionel, with Lionel admitting his hand in his parents' death leading to him getting arrested.
66	22	"Covenant"	Greg Beeman	Story by : Todd Slavkin & Darren Swimmer; Teleplay by : Alfred Gough & Miles Millar	May 19, 2004	176222	5.92
A girl (Adrienne Palicki), calling herself Kara and claiming to be from Krypton, emerges from the woods and arrives at the Kents, where she urges Clark to embrace his destiny. Clark turns to his parents for advice, but is shocked when Kara forces Jonathan to finally reveal the deal he made with Jor-El. Clark makes a discovery that leads him to feel badly betrayed by Lex, and his inability to have a relationship with Lana is once more evident as she leaves for Paris. After a talk with Chloe, Jonathan catches up to Clark and reveals that Kara's real name is Lindsay Harrison. After making Lindsay disappear upon her serving her purpose, Jor-El takes Clark, leaving Jonathan strangled half to death. A Kryptonian symbol is burned into the Kent's farmland. Lionel has his head shaved in prison while Lex is poisoned and Chloe is apparently killed in a safehouse explosion.

== Cast and characters ==
=== Main ===
- Tom Welling as Clark Kent
  - Welling also portrays a young Jor-El in "Relic"
- Kristin Kreuk as Lana Lang
  - Kreuk also portrays Louise McCallum in "Relic"
- Michael Rosenbaum as Lex Luthor
- Sam Jones III as Pete Ross (Note: Absent in five episodes)
- Allison Mack as Chloe Sullivan (Note: Absent in two episodes)
- John Glover as Lionel Luthor (Note: Absent in six episodes)
- Annette O'Toole as Martha Kent
- John Schneider as Jonathan Kent

=== Recurring ===
- Françoise Yip as Dr. Lia Teng
- Camille Mitchell as Sheriff Nancy Adams
- Ian Somerhalder as Adam Knight
- Gary Hudson as Agent Frank Loder

== Production ==
Going into season three, the Smallville crew wanted to establish two main themes, which were the consequences of Clark Kent running from his destiny, and Lex Luthor taking steps toward "the dark side". One of the consequences the creative team attempted to show for Clark was his distancing himself from his friends. Season three was also about showing just how evil Lionel Luthor was, which is illustrated by how he attempts to destroy Chloe Sullivan's life and make Lex believe that he is going insane. In order to get better performances from the actors in each individual episode, the crew would often limit the detail an actor knew about their character. Meeting just at the beginning of the year to discuss the plans for the actor's respective roles, usually the actors would only find out precisely what their characters were going to do when the scripts arrived. Other times, an actor might be given a specific piece of character development and told to keep it a secret from the rest of the cast.

=== Writing ===
Developers and showrunners Alfred Gough and Miles Millar wanted to set up Lex's "mental illness" early in the season, as it would be something that Lionel would take advantage of in later episodes of season three. In order to accomplish what they wanted, Gough and Millar introduced Lex's imaginary friend "Louis", who appeared on the deserted island with Lex following his plane crash in the season two finale. They had Michael Rosenbaum pull what they referred to as the "Fight Club gag", where he believes that he is fighting Louis, but in reality he has been fighting himself the entire time. This would culminate in the episode "Shattered", where, as writer/executive producer Mark Verheiden explains, the episode was set up like something out of the film Gaslight (1944), where the audience believes that Lex is being driven insane.

"The sacrifice of the father is that he'll sacrifice anything to get Clark back – so he sacrifices his health".
— Miles Millar on Jonathan Kent's heart problem

The final scene in "Exile", which extended into the opening act of "Phoenix", was the establishment of a storyline that would run the course of the third season, and even extend further into season five. The storyline involved Jonathan Kent making a deal with Clark's biological father, Jor-El, to be given powers strong enough to bring Clark back home; the result was a heart attack for Jonathan later in the season, whose body could not handle the powers. Gough and Millar wanted to be able to provide answers for certain aspects of the Superman mythology, in this case it was Jonathan's heart condition. According to Verheiden, the idea of having Jonathan suffer a heart attack came to the writing team in season one. The story was almost used in season two's "Fever", but they finally settled on an appropriate story in season three that would tie Jonathan directly to Jor-El when he made a deal to bring Clark home that would eventually lead to a heart attack in the episode "Hereafter".

The writing staff wanted to touch on the fact that even though Clark has all of these powers he cannot save everyone, as well as expanding on the idea of Clark's continual feeling of isolation. "Asylum" served to remind Clark that he cannot save everyone when he fails to stop Lionel from giving Lex electric shock therapy, which ultimately erases seven weeks of Lex's memory that includes his knowledge that Lionel murdered his own parents. Like season two's "Ryan", Clark is faced with the reality that he is not "God", and that he will fail to save people from time to time.

"We were exploring the idea that Clark is an alien, and being what he is, is different on an almost cosmic scale [...] that takes him outside the metaphysical reach of this kid's ability [and] enabled Clark to prevent the things from happening that the kid was seeing".
— Mark Verheiden on Clark's existence

The episode "Forsaken" was designed to set up many of the plot points in the season finale, particularly those dealing with Clark's feeling of isolation, specifically that of Pete Ross and Lana Lang's departure from Smallville. Next to establishing a heart condition for Jonathan, the team also wanted to address the idea of Clark's mortality, or lack-thereof. The concept in "Hereafter" of Clark possibly never dying came from an idea that sprouted after season one's "Hourglass". In "Hourglass", Cassandra Carver, a blind elderly woman who can see the future of the person she touches, shows Clark a future where he is surrounded by the tombstones of everyone he loves. For "Hereafter", Jordan Cross can see the moment of death for anyone he touches; when Jordan touches Clark he does not see Clark's death, only a billowing red cape. According to Verheiden, they wanted to illustrate how Clark's alien heritage put him on a different plane of existence, and allowed him to alter destiny.

The idea to use Superman's cape, which came from Millar, to represent Clark's "cosmic lifespan", came after much discussion on what to actually use. Ideas were thrown around, including a shot of Lex dumping kryptonite on Clark, as he is lying down, killing him. Ultimately they went with Millar's idea, which they saw as this "great iconic moment", because the audience finally sees their first glimpse of Superman's costume. Superman's cape was not the only iconic imagery used during the third season. The episode "Whisper" not only introduced a new superpower for Clark, his super hearing, but allowed the writing staff the opportunity to provide a sort of "in-joke" to the audience. The team wrote in a gag where Clark wears a pair of eyeglasses, a staple of his disguise later in life while working at the Daily Planet. In the episode, an accident with Clark's heat vision causes him to go blind; as his eyes heal, he is forced to wear a pair of prescription eyeglasses until he fully regains his sight. "Perry" would introduce Clark's future boss, and editor of the Daily Planet, Perry White. This episode would also serve as the point where Clark finally learns that his powers are caused by the radiation from Earth's yellow Sun.

==== Early ideas ====
Jonathan's heart attack was not the only element that originated during the filming of season one. The use of kryptonite bullets was shelved during season one for a later date because of the limited number of episodes they are able to produce each season, as well as the writers wanting to find "the right moment" to use this particular plot element. They ultimately settled on season three's "Extinction", about a teenager seeking revenge against everyone infected by the meteors. "Extinction" featured a tie-in with a season two episode; Van McNulty's reason for killing meteor-infected individuals is based on the fact that his father was killed by the bone-morphing Tina Greer in "Visage", when she impersonated Whitney Fordman. Van's father was the military personnel that came to the Fordman house to inform Whitney's mother that he had been killed in action. "Relic" was another episode that featured an element first thought up back in the first season, which was the use of the same actors to play both their present-day characters and their characters' distant relatives in flashback sequences. It was not used because the crew felt that the audience needed to have more time to become involved with the characters that are featured on the show on a regular basis.

"Velocity" also began its life as an idea being tossed around during season one. The team thought about having an episode devoted to small town drag racing, as it was a problem in the Vancouver area while they were filming season one. The story was eventually used in season three, when the writing staff was looking for a reason to exploit the changing friendship between Clark and Pete. According to Verheiden, they wanted a moment where Pete could release his feelings to Clark, and the jealousy he has over Clark spending more time with Lex and Lana. The episode featured the moment when the friendship between Clark and Pete "fractured a bit". "Obsession" featured a scene first thought up in season two's "Visage", which called for the use of lead paint to block the effects of kryptonite on Clark when Tina trapped him in the storm cellar with Lana's kryptonite necklace. The scene was rewritten to have Clark's spaceship save him, and used later in "Obsession", where Clark and Chloe use lead paint to trap the teleporting Alicia Baker.

==== Story alterations ====
As the episode development progressed, the writing staff found that not all of their original ideas fit as well as they first thought. When this happens, the staff is forced to change aspects of an episode in order to save time, better develop characters, or stay in line with the rest of the season. For example, in the original script for "Whisper", the thieves who try and rob the jewelry store were going to be father and son. Clark was also originally going to be blind until the end of "Whisper". The team decided that "it wasn't going to be too satisfying to watch", so Clark received his sight back midway through the episode. The original script for "Velocity" had Clark and Pete playing basketball at the end of the episode, as if nothing had happened. This was revised to have Pete apologize to Clark for forcing him to abuse his powers, and having Clark question whether the two could ever have the same friendship they once had. "Resurrection" originally featured the character of Garrett bonding with Clark over Jonathan's heart condition, as Garrett's father—later changed to his brother—was dying. As the episode progresses, elements of the story were changed and Garrett drifted from being sympathetic to being a darker character who was eventually killed by a police sniper. In the original draft of "Truth", Mrs. Taylor did not reveal that she had been part of an activist group that had done some illegal activity years earlier, but that she was having an affair with a student. As Gough sees it, using the affair storyline would have created more scenes that would need to be shot in order to effectively tell that part of the episode, and using the concept that Mrs. Taylor had been on the run from the law worked easier for the crew.

One of the bigger changes to the season, and the series as a whole, was the character of Pete being written out of the series. The writers had hoped that having Pete know Clark's secret would make him more of a fundamental piece of the show, but it did not. What ultimately happened was that it led to his character becoming increasingly alienated from the other characters, which resulted in his exit from the show. Although there were no real changes to "Talisman", Gough has stated that he wishes they could go back and redo aspects of the episode, because it failed to provide an "entry point". He believes that if someone had not been watching the show previously, they would not have been able to follow the story; to the random observer the episode was simply about two men, Lionel and Joseph Willowbrook, searching for an ancient dagger. The episode lacked elements that would bring in a younger audience, and, in Gough's words, was "too mythologized".

=== Filming ===
==== Directing debut ====
Season three saw the directing debut of Millar, who got to direct the episode "Memoria". Tom Welling describes Millar's style as very succinct, to which he credits to Millar's background of writing for all of the characters on the show. As Welling explains, Millar managed to capture the same effect as other directors, but with fewer words. Millar's visual style, at least for this episode, tended to lean more to applying "extreme lighting" to the scenes, to create silhouettes of the characters. Millar was inspired by the film Kings Row (1942) when he filmed the scene for Lex's birthday party as a child. In the scene, a camera pulls back from a flashback transition to reveal a young Lex sitting alone at a large table full of food and gifts. Instead of using the same techniques that were employed in previous episodes for transitioning between the present and the past, Millar decided to shift between the two time frames by transitioning between the older Lex and the younger Lex. This required Rosenbaum to rely more on Millar's direction, so that the emotional level was matched between himself and the young actor portraying Lex, Wayne Dalglish. One particular scene seemed to provide Millar with the most trouble, mainly because of the constraints of the film division at Warner Bros. In the scene, Jor-El and Lara are placing the infant Kal-El into his spaceship during Krypton's final moments. At the time, Warner Bros. was working on a new Superman film, and it was going to be an origin story. This affected how much Smallville could actually show. The film department prohibited Millar from showing Krypton, or Jor-El and Lara. As a result, Millar took inspiration from a comic book written by Jeph Loeb. In Loeb's book, Jor-El and Lara are depicted as just a pair of hands holding on to each other after they place Kal-El into his spaceship.

==== Last minute changes ====
As production commences, occasionally the filmmakers find that they have to make last minute changes to the episode in order to explain certain situations better, or because a better idea came along after they were finished. Sometimes, these last minute changes will happen shortly before an episode is broadcast. The opening teaser for "Exile" was added approximately one week before the episode aired. The crew wanted to show Clark having fun with his powers while he was on red kryptonite, and the opening they filmed did not illustrate that well enough. The original opening featured Clark buying a car; the new opening showed how he acquired the money to buy the car, which involved him robbing several ATMs. The crew reshot the final scene in "Truth" between Clark and Chloe, where Chloe apologizes for trying to use her recently acquired ability to get the truth out of anyone to dig into Clark's past. Originally, Clark did not accept her apology, but the crew felt that was too strong, especially since she was under the influence of kryptonite, so they refilmed it with Clark accepting her apology.

The final moment in "Crisis", of Lionel preparing to kill himself, was also added at the last minute. John Glover and the crew filmed the scene during the filming of "Memoria", which occurred a week before "Crisis" was going to air. While filming, Greg Beeman, James Marshall, and Millar were all sitting behind the monitors, trying to come up with the cliffhanger ending that was going to be attached to "Crisis". Beeman added the moment where the phone rings, interrupting Lionel from completing his suicide; this was used as the opening for "Legacy" and it all eventually set up Lionel's terminal liver disease. Another late change, though it was not at the last minute, came for Lionel's physical appearance on the show. Glover came up with the idea of cutting Lionel's hair for the season finale. Glover was busy preparing for a play that he was going to be acting in, and he needed his hair cut for the part. Glover made the suggestion while the crew was filming "Memoria", as well as the idea of setting the scene in prison. Gough admits to needing some kind of device to cut back to while all of the other cliffhangers are occurring—Clark being taken away, the Kryptonian symbol burned into field on the Kent farm, and Lex being poisoned—and he felt that Glover's suggestion would help them pull off the effect they wanted.

Not all of the last minute changes were about adding new situations to an episode. Ken Horton pulled a scene in "Phoenix" before it aired, which involved Chloe informing Lionel that she will no longer help him dig up information on Clark. He then placed it in "Extinction", which he felt was a better location for it given the events that transpired in "Phoenix". Rutger Hauer was supposed to reprise his role as Morgan Edge for the episode "Shattered", but he had a scheduling conflict that prevented him from returning. Instead, the crew hired Patrick Bergin, and had to rewrite the episode to feature a Morgan Edge who had recently undergone plastic surgery to alter his appearance and voice. One of the reasons for casting Bergin was because the two actors have the same build, lending to the realism that these two actors could portray the same character. Scenes involving Allison Mack and Kristin Kreuk were cut from the episode "Memoria"—with the exception of the opening teaser where Lana finds Lex on the balcony and then informing Clark—as the team felt they were inappropriate for the episode, which stood well on just the story arc involving Clark, Lex, and Lionel. This also directed the episode into more of a "mothers and sons" feel that departed from the usual "fathers and sons" tone the show had come to use.

==== Sets and locations ====
With the show being filmed in the Vancouver area, many local industries will substitute for Smallville and Metropolis businesses. For the scene where Clark buys a car with stolen money in "Exile", the production crew converted a local bank lobby into a dealership showroom. The Vancouver YMCA served as a stand-in for the Smallville Medical Center. The interior scenes of Summerholt Institute were shot in a local train-car washing building, so that they had enough room to create and film the tank of kryptonite solution. The set was found early in the production of season three, but the crew could not find a use for it until then. The exterior shots were filmed at an abandoned building owned by the Sierra Wireless Company. The building was a spare built by Sierra Wireless to accommodate their growing company. The flashback sequences filmed in "Memoria", of a young Lex with his infant brother Julian, were shot underneath the St. George's Preparatory School, on a specially designed set by Rob Maier. St. George's also doubled as Lex's childhood prep school. The LuthorCorp facility was constructed at an active sewage treatment facility in the Vancouver area. David Willson built the LuthorCorp labs inside the facility's hallways.

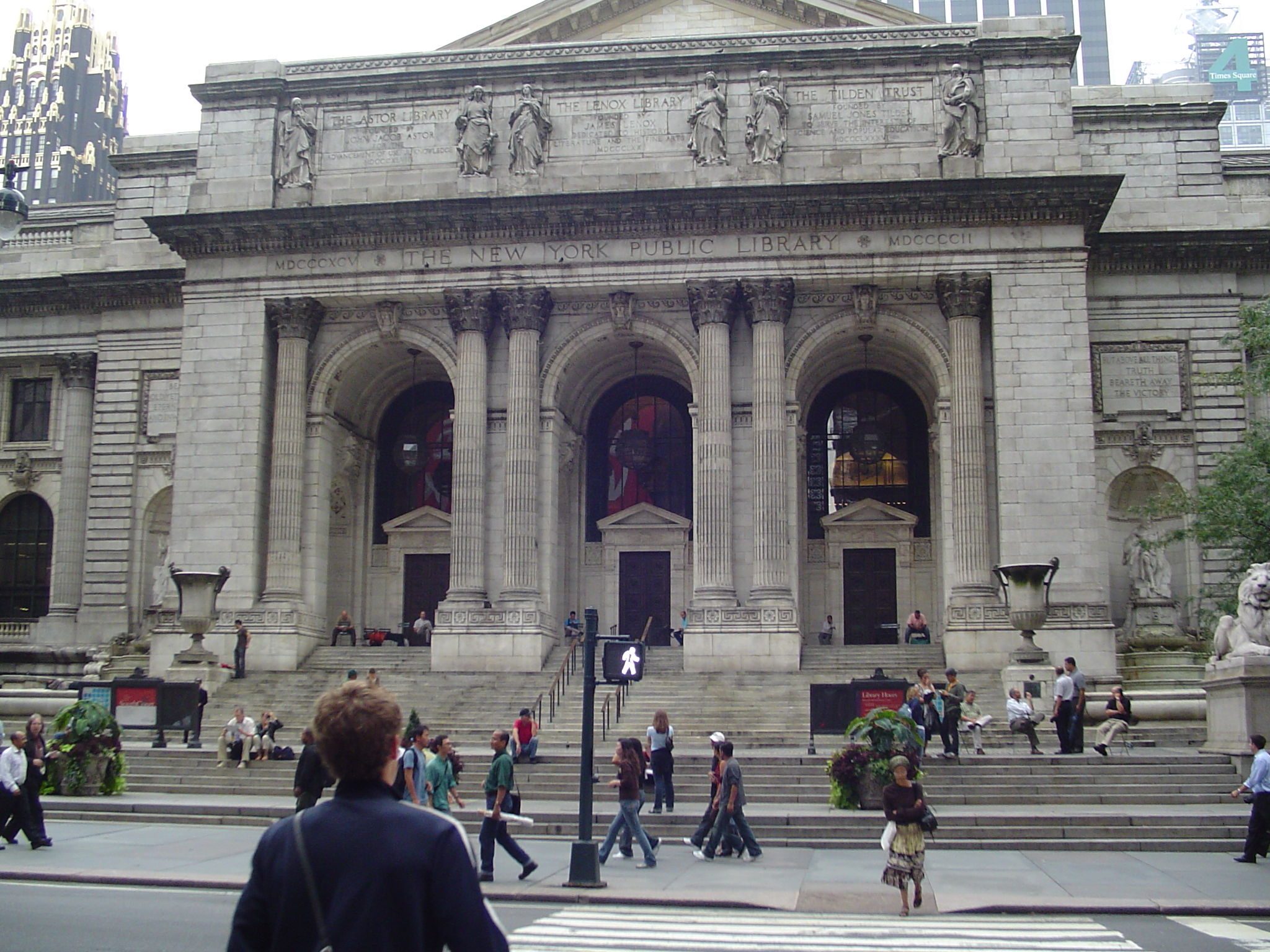
The New York Public Library lent its interior to the Smallville crew so that they could film Christopher Reeve's scenes.

Because of budget constraints, the production crew will often recycle sets to save money. For instance, the hospital corridor for Smallville Medical Center was transformed into Lex's cell in "Asylum", which was later transformed into the asylum corridor, before finally being morphed into Dr. Teng's laboratory in later episodes. When the production crew could not afford to rent a local night club, with all of the extras they needed, for more than one night they decided to film all of the wide shots—capturing the three hundred plus extras—on the first night. Then, with their remaining funds, they filmed close-ups of the actors with a limit of fifty extras in the background. When scenes in the season three premiere called for Lex to be stranded on a deserted island, instead of traveling to a beach, the crew found a mountain range in Vancouver that had an area in front of the mountain that resembled a beach. The resemblance was close enough that all they needed to do was to bring in some palm trees to complete the aesthetic they were going for. All of the island scenes were shot in one day.

Sometimes the crew cannot get around the creation of a new set, or traveling to a remote location to film scenes for an episode. For instance, the Luthor mansion set was expanded this season. The production crew first began by expanding the second level in Lex's office, and then exposed the staircase leading up to the second level – it had originally been hidden by a wall. They also added a skylight and inserted lights in the background, giving the room a larger appearance. For scenes in "Legacy" that involved Dr. Virgil Swann, the crew traveled with Christopher Reeve to the New York Public Library to film, which was easier for him to journey to. Reeve's schedule forced the production crew to shoot his scenes a month before the script for the episode was finalized. In season two, the crew was able to use the set of NBC's Third Watch (1999–2005), courtesy of John Wells, to film Reeve's scenes. The opening segment for "Truth" where Chloe questions a former co-worker of her father's about why her father was blacklisted by Lionel, had to be filmed over two nights; the crew ran out of time the first night because of the weather, so they filmed Mack's scenes in front of the studio.

=== Effects ===
==== Physical effects ====
Effects are an important element in the production of most episodes, and sometimes those effects must be performed practically. One of the largest stunts for the season was performed in "Exile", where two stunt men were dropped from 300 feet down to eight feet above the ground. The effect was used for the scene where Jonathan and Clark are fighting and fall from Lionel's office at LuthorCorp. Producer Bob Hargrove petitioned for the scene to be shot with real stuntmen, as opposed to using computer-generated effects, which was an idea that was being tossed around at the time of filming. During another fight scene, Kim Chang and Lorelei Connelly stepped in for Mack and Kreuk for where Lana and Chloe get into a fight at school. The scene took two full days of shooting to complete, and involved many different angles to be shot. Close-ups of Mack and Kreuk were filmed of them fighting up to the point that a big fall would take place, and then Chang and Connelly would shoot the same actions from a further distance away and continue through the fall. Then, Mack would continue the fight scene with Chang, where they filmed just Mack's side of the fight. As Mack tumbled over Chang filming would stop, with everyone frozen in their place, and Kreuk would replace Chang in the scene and filming would resume.

Although there are stunt people on the sets for each episode, the cast was more than willing to take on some of the stunt-work themselves. Welling and John Schneider performed a lot of their own stunts for the scene where Clark and Jonathan, with the powers to take on his son, battle over Clark's use of the red kryptonite in "Exile". This lent to the filmmakers being able to show more of the two actor's faces during the scene, which also lends more realism to the audience. As part of the opening scene for "Extinction", which involved Lana being attacked in the school pool, Kreuk spent thirteen hours in the water as they filmed the scene.

==== Digital effects ====
When a practical effect cannot be accomplished, the crew turns to Entity FX to create digital imagery for a given scene. Sometimes this imagery is to substitute action sequences that they cannot do on-site, and other times it is used to create subtle foreground or background effects. For instance, a matte painting is used to establish the Metropolis background, which is composed of buildings from several modern-day cities in addition to Vancouver; they include Singapore and Hong Kong among others. For the scene where Clark rips his shirt open in the phone booth, revealing the tattoo, visual effects were added to the tattoo illuminating it. In order to add the effects, the middle pane of glass was removed from the phone booth so that the special effects team had a clear line to Welling's chest; they re-added the middle pane digitally, adding reflections so that it looked natural.

Entity FX used a combination of 3-dimensional and 2-dimensional digital imagery when they created a duplicate Ian.

For the end of "Exile", Joey Bratazani and Brian Harding worked on the computer effects shots of the Kryptonian tattoo, which was burned into Clark's chest at the end of season two, disappearing at the end of Clark's fight with Jonathan. John Wash describes the effect as being similar to a time-lapse, where someone would watch a flower grow, but in the reverse. Bratazani and Harding had to track the effect to Welling's chest, in order for it to look like his skin was really being burned from underneath; otherwise, the shot would have appeared to be just a 2-dimensional light being broadcast on his chest. Just like the Kryptonian tattoo was something created digitally in season two, so was the digital body duplication of Ian Randall, which the special effects team had the chance to work on for a second time in season three's "Asylum". For "Asylum", special effects coordinator Mat Beck and his team used 3-dimensional strands for Ian's separation, which gave the team more control, as well as make the strands appear "gooier and grosser". The original effect in season two consisted of Entity FX using a primary shot of a CGI face pushing its way through a CGI back in three dimensions. This time, the team used a two dimensional shot appearing on a wall—known as "shadow play"—as though the audience is seeing Ian's shadow as he splits himself; lastly, the team applied another two dimensional effect to the final moment of separation, when strands of CGI flesh snap back to each body.

The refusal by the film department to allow Smallville to show Jor-El forced the special effects crew to come up with a creative way to display some sort of aid to help the audience visualize this disembodied voice that was supposed to be talking to Jonathan in "Exile". They decided to create a force field around whoever was speaking to Jor-El, which acted as Jor-El's voice, rippling as he spoke. To save money on this effect, the crew filmed Schneider on a black backdrop, and Entity FX digitally added the force field around him. Wind machines and a spot light were added to help synthesize the atmosphere in the force field. Another aspect of the Superman mythology appeared in season three's "Hereafter", and was also created digitally: Superman's cape. In the scene, Clark is touched by a boy who sees the moment of someone's death; when he touches Clark he does not see Clark's death but a cape flapping in the wind. Instead of just shooting a practical cape billowing, the scene was developed entirely by a computer. Created primarily by John Hahn, the idea was to show the cape but not so clearly that it would be obvious to the audience what they were looking at. As Beck explained: "You get a hint of the 'S', but not quite".

A scene in the episode "Crisis", where Adam Knight returns and subsequently shoots Lana in an alley, resulted in Entity FX doing more special effects work on a single scene than is typically performed. To make sure the computer-generated effects matched the set the actors were filming on, Beck left his office in Los Angeles and travelled to the Smallville set to work alongside Wash and Hahn in constructing the scene. Horton wanted to be able to see the bullet travelling through each of the raindrops as it made its way toward Lana. To accomplish this, the team made the digital bullet larger than normal for better visibility. While filming, a flash zoom was created that would track around Kreuk as she was running, achieving the effect of watching the bullet get fired from the gun, fly through the raindrops, and then as the camera rotates around the bullet is seen just as it about to hit Lana before Clark runs in and stops it. This moment in the scene is done in a freeze-frame shot, and the moment Clark stops the bullet everything returns to real time.

The alley scene had to use a lot of computer-generated imagery to accomplish the look that the team needed. The entire alley had to be tracked by the computer in order to make sure that the digital raindrops hit all the objects in the frame, including dumpsters that were visible. In order to achieve the effect of time freezing around Lana just as she is about to get shot and fall to the ground, Kreuk had to lean against a structural support and hold her body still while filming. Beck and his team had to digitally remove the support from Kreuk, as well as the lower half of her body. They inserted a computer-generated lower half, as well as some hair trailing behind her in order to show that she was in the process of running when time stopped. As time returned to normal, what the audience sees is a completely computer-generated body fall out of frame, as only Lana's lower half is in frame when time returns to normal.

Entity FX digitally created the various parts of Clark's eardrum, which was used to simulate the activation of his ability.

In another instance involving bullets, Entity FX had the job of digitally creating kryptonite bullets, which were fired at Clark in the episode "Extinction". Wash and his team discussed ways to make the kryptonite bullets unique in their own right, so they decided that since the bullets were made of kryptonite that they might have some kind of reaction to the atmosphere as they flew through it. The computer effects team then created a "green aura, with a little plasma envelope around the bullet" as it flew through the frame, in slow-motion, toward Clark.

Entity FX also had to create the first instance of Clark's super hearing, an ability he acquires in the episode "Whisper". As Beck described the task: "When you talk about someone flying, it's something we all know, but this is super hearing and we need to see a visual for the hearing". For the effect of showing Clark using his super hearing, Beck and Entity FX decided that they wanted to travel into Clark's ear and see all the different parts of his eardrum working together to create the sound he is hearing. The task proved difficult to achieve, and Beck asserts that changes will be made to perfect the look of Clark using his super hearing. Clark's super hearing was originally to be revealed early in the season, but when The WB informed the Smallville team that Tarzan, the main character in the studio's update of the classic legend, also had super hearing the team decided to delay the introduction so that the ability could be used in a manner that surpassed what was shown on Tarzan. The WB's Tarzan (2003) was canceled before "Whisper" aired, allowing Smallville to be the only show on the network with a character who has superhuman hearing.

== Tie-ins ==
Season three saw the second volume of Smallville: Chloe Chronicles get released. After the first volume received positive responses from viewers, the second volume was created as a continuation, with Jones III appearing as Pete Ross alongside Mack as Chloe Sullivan. This volume used the Smallville comic books as a secondary tie-in to the series. Viewers could watch Smallville, followed by Chloe's Chronicles, and finish with the Smallville comic book, which would provide an "enhanced backstory to the online segments". Additionally, the Smallville producers teamed up with Verizon to provide its registered users the chance to view plot updates—in the form of a press release from the Daily Planet—as well as quizzes and games related to the series. As part of the deal, Verizon products and services were placed in various episodes of the series.

== Awards ==
In 2004, the show was nominated for a Golden Reel Award for Best Sound Editing in "Exile". The series was recognized by the Visual Effects Society with a 2005 VES Award nomination for Outstanding Compositing for the episode "Crisis". The DVD release of season three won the Saturn Award for Best DVD Television Release.

== Home media release ==
The complete third season of Smallville was released on November 16, 2004, in North America. Additional releases in region 2 and region 4 took place on April 18 and July 18, 2005, respectively. The DVD box set included various special features, including episode commentary, The Chloe Chronicles: Volume II, a behind-the-scenes featurette on how they produce the series, and DVD-ROM linking to Smallville websites. For the 20th anniversary, the complete series was released for the first time on Blu-ray on October 16, 2021. The Blu-ray release marks the first time when season 3 was released in its native high-definition resolution.
