= Smallville season 7 =

Season of television series

Smallville
- Season 7
- DVD and Blu-ray cover featuring Tom Welling and Laura Vandervoort
- Showrunners: Alfred Gough; Miles Millar
- Starring: Tom Welling; Michael Rosenbaum; Kristin Kreuk; Allison Mack; Erica Durance; Aaron Ashmore; Laura Vandervoort; John Glover
- No. of episodes: 20

Release
- Original network: The CW
- Original release: September 27, 2007 – May 15, 2008

Season chronology
- ← Previous; Season 6 Next → Season 8

The seventh season of Smallville, an American television series developed by Alfred Gough and Miles Millar, began airing on September 27, 2007 on The CW. The series recounts the early adventures of Kryptonian Clark Kent as he adjusts to life in the fictional town of Smallville, Kansas, during the years before he becomes Superman. The seventh season comprises 20 episodes and concluded its initial airing on May 15, 2008. Regular cast members during season seven include Tom Welling, Michael Rosenbaum, Kristin Kreuk, Allison Mack, Erica Durance, Aaron Ashmore, Laura Vandervoort, and John Glover, with Ashmore promoted after having a recurring role in season six. In addition to bringing in new regular cast members this season, the Smallville team brought in familiar faces from the Superman media history, old villains from the show's past, as well as new DC Comics characters Kara Zor-El and Dinah Lance.

This season focuses on Clark (Welling) meeting his biological cousin Kara (Vandervoort) and teaching her how to control her abilities in public; Lana Lang's (Kreuk) behavior toward her friends and Lex Luthor (Rosenbaum) after it is discovered that she faked her own death; and Chloe Sullivan (Mack) coming to terms with her newly discovered kryptonite-induced ability. Towards the end of the season, Clark faces the dual threat from returning villain Brainiac and Lex's discovery of his father Lionel's (Glover) secret society who possess the means to control Clark. The season culminates with a showdown between Lex and Clark at the Fortress of Solitude, wherein it is brought down, setting the series up for the following season.

Smallville's season seven, along with many other American television shows, was caught in the middle of a contract dispute between the Writers Guild of America, East (WGAE), Writers Guild of America, west (WGAw) and the Alliance of Motion Picture and Television Producers (AMPTP). The dispute led to a strike by the writers, which has caused this season to end prematurely with only 20 episodes being produced, instead of the standard 22 episodes. The strike also forced The CW to push back airdates on several episodes, and cost Mack her directorial debut. Smallville's season seven slipped in the ratings, averaging 3.7 million viewers weekly, and the series ranked as the 175th most-watched television series, out of 220, for the 2007–08 television year.

== Episodes ==
- In Canada, all season seven episodes originally aired one day earlier than their normal United States airings.

No. overall	No. in season	Title	Directed by	Written by	Original release date	Prod. code	U.S. viewers (millions)
133	1	"Bizarro"	Michael Rohl	Brian Peterson & Kelly Souders	September 27, 2007	3T6301	5.18
After confronting Bizarro, which resulted in Reeves Dam bursting, Clark stops a flood. Lex is saved from the flood by an unknown girl who he later believes to be an angel giving him a second chance at redemption. An unconscious Lionel is taken by an unknown person. Chloe is pronounced dead at the hospital, but she resurrects herself in the morgue. Clark discovers his doppelgänger's weakness, the yellow sun, and exploits it with the help of Martian Manhunter (Phil Morris). Lana is revealed to be alive and living in Shanghai.
134	2	"Kara"	James Conway	Todd Slavkin & Darren Swimmer	October 4, 2007	3T6302	4.59
Clark discovers he has a cousin named Kara who was stuck in suspended animation for eighteen years. After a rocky first meeting, where Clark and Kara fight, the two soon band together to find Kara's stolen ship. Together they find her ship, which was taken by the Department of Domestic Security (DDS), but it is in self-destruct mode. Kara absorbs the explosion before it can kill anyone. Later, Kara reveals that a Kryptonian crystal, hidden inside the ship, was stolen before the ship exploded. Lex finds Lana, who used an inert LuthorCorp clone of herself to help fake her own death, in Shanghai. Lois begins reporting on the spaceship and catches the attention of the Daily Planet's new editor, Grant Gabriel (Michael Cassidy). Grant is tough on Chloe who thinks she has lost her touch and gives Lois, who he thinks is a star, a job. Lex returns to Smallville, determined to find the girl who saved his life. Clark begins his training, with his first task being to watch over Kara as Jor-El (voiced by Terence Stamp) does not trust her.
135	3	"Fierce"	Whitney Ransick	Holly Harold	October 11, 2007	3T6303	4.82
Kara decides she wants to join the Miss Sweet Corn Pageant. Clark tries to teach Kara to control her abilities, so she does not expose their secrets, but gets frustrated with her lack of concentration. Lana returns to Smallville, with all legal charges dropped against her, and reunites with Clark. The Weather Girls consisting of the cryokinetic Tyler (Eva Marcille), the wind manipulating Tempest (Christine Chatelain), and the pyrokinetic Carly (Elisa King), come to Smallville looking for buried treasure. After killing Carly, Tyler and Tempest witness Kara using her abilities and convince her to help them steal some buried treasure. The treasure turns out to be an SOS alert from another Kryptonian on Earth. Lex confronts Kara and promises to find out the truth of her abilities as he questions if she is a savior or a warning, despite his trying to be a better person.
136	4	"Cure"	Rick Rosenthal	Al Septien & Turi Meyer	October 18, 2007	3T6304	5.18
Chloe learns that Dr. Curtis Knox (Dean Cain) has a surgical cure for those affected by kryptonite, so she sets up an appointment, knowing a side effect could be memory loss. Knox turns out to be an immortal serial killer who kills Sasha Woodman (Jovanna Huguet). Martian Manhunter shows up at the Kent home and warns Clark that he cannot trust Kara. He explains that her father, Zor-El, attempted to assassinate Clark's father. Clark is told to find Kara's crystal before she does, but he is side-tracked fighting Knox, who is attempting to take Chloe's heart and transplant it into the woman he loves. Lana uses the $10 million she stole from Lex to buy surveillance equipment to spy on him.
137	5	"Action"	Mairzee Almas	Caroline Dries	October 25, 2007	3T6306	4.65
While filming of the Warrior Angel film takes place on the Kent farm, Clark saves lead actress Rachel Davenport (Christina Milian) from a car crash. After some researching by Chloe, it is discovered that someone is trying to kill Rachel, because they believe her character should die, like she does in the comics. Clark's secret is uncovered by the attacker, Ben Meyers (Christopher Jacot), when he is witnessed stopping a bullet intended for Rachel. Ben attempts to kill Lana in hopes that her death will make Clark see his true destiny as Earth's savior. Lana is revealed to be the one who kidnapped Lionel. When he is finally freed, Lionel informs Lana that he knows she kidnapped him. Rachel gifts Clark a red cape.
138	6	"Lara"	James Conway	Don Whitehead & Holly Henderson	November 1, 2007	3T6305	4.38
Clark learns that Kara is in Washington, D.C. looking for the crystal from her ship. Kara learns the exact location of the crystal, but it is not there when she arrives. Clark confronts her in a club, but she flies away. With Jimmy's help, Kara follows a path to Lex's mansion, but Agent Carter (Kim Coates) is waiting. Using kryptonite handcuffs, Carter takes Kara back to Virginia. Using a kryptonite truth serum, Carter attempts to learn about Krypton. Flashbacks reveal Clark's biological mother Lara (Helen Slater) and Kara visited the Kent farm when Lara was pregnant to see if Clark would be raised well. Clark interrupts Carter and saves Kara with Lionel's help, but gets to see the flashbacks too where he watches his mother, but also he and Kara learn Zor-El (Christopher Heyerdahl) wasn't a good man. Later on, Kara gives Clark a photo of Lara and says she is going to enjoy being here with him on Earth. Clark shows Lana that he has Kara's crystal, which contains Lara's DNA.
139	7	"Wrath"	Charles Beeson	Kelly Souders & Brian Peterson	November 8, 2007	3T6307	4.64
Lightning strikes a windmill on the Kent farm while Clark is weakened by nearby kryptonite; the bolt travels through him and Lana, transferring a portion of his powers to her. Clark begins to worry about Lana's use of the powers after remembering what happened to Eric Summers and Jonathan when they were imbued with Clark's powers. Lana becomes more aggressive with the powers, stealing confidential files from Lex—which show that Lex has been keeping what remains of Milton Fine's ship—and later attacking him. Clark learns Lana kidnapped Lionel. After a battle with Clark, Lana's powers are reabsorbed when Clark uses a high voltage shock and kryptonite to take the powers back. During the fight, Fine's remains are released. Elsewhere, Clark and Chloe learn the Isis Foundation is just a ruse for Lana's spying, while Lex tells Clark Lana still has feelings for him after kissing her during the fight. Lois works on a story exposing Lex, which Grant refuses to allow. He later deletes her evidence and she kisses him. Fine's remains take over a scientist. Clark confronts Lana about the person she has become, saying they still don't trust each other and things aren't the same anymore. Lana asks Clark if he still loves her and he doesn't respond.
140	8	"Blue"	Glen Winter	Todd Slavkin & Darren Swimmer	November 15, 2007	3T6308	4.51
Clark uses Kara's crystal to resurrect Lara, but unknowingly brings Zor-El back. Lara unwittingly gives Clark a blue kryptonite ring that strips his powers, while Zor-El tries to take over the world. Lois and Grant's romantic relationship is discovered by Lex and Chloe. Grant and Lex are revealed to be working together, and Grant is revealed to be Lex's younger brother Julian Luthor, as Lionel faked his death. Clark gets to the Fortress and shatters the crystal, which destroys Zor-El and Lara. Kara is transported to Detroit, Michigan, with no memory of who she is, and Jor-El informs Clark there will be consequences for his repeated defiance.
141	9	"Gemini"	Whitney Ransick	Caroline Dries	December 13, 2007	3T6309	3.71
Around Christmas, Clark has been missing for over two weeks. He finally returns, wanting him and Lana to team up in order to take down Lex. They discover through the scientist Fine took over that Fine is still alive. Adrian Cross (Tim Guinee), one of Lex's experimental patients, plants a bomb on Chloe, threatening to kill her if Lois does not get Lex to admit that he is cloning humans. Lois confronts Lex and after she is knocked unconscious by Lex, it is revealed that Adrian is a failed clone of Lex's brother Julian. Adrian also reveals that Grant is the successful clone. Fearing that she will die, Chloe confesses to Jimmy that she was infected by the meteor rocks and they kiss. She later reveals her power is healing people. Lex buys the Daily Planet and an angry Grant breaks up with Lois. In the end, it is revealed that Bizarro has been posing as Clark the entire time, unbeknownst to anyone else, and Clark is trapped, frozen in ice, at the Fortress.
142	10	"Persona"	Todd Slavkin	Don Whitehead & Holly Henderson	January 31, 2008	3T6310	3.81
Lana is unaware that Bizarro is impersonating Clark and reveals information about Fine (James Marsters) to him. Bizarro tracks down Fine in the hope that he will help him combat his yellow sun weakness. Fine directs Bizarro to Dax-Ur (Marc McClure), a Kryptonian scientist who came to Earth years earlier. Jor-El releases Clark from his imprisonment so he can defeat Bizarro. Clark receives blue kryptonite from Dax-Ur and uses it to destroy Bizarro. Clark unwittingly leads Fine to Dax-Ur who uses Dax-Ur to restore his powers. After Grant reveals his true identity to Lionel, who wants to accept him as his son, Lex has him killed. Clark and Lana lie in bed together close but far apart, their relationship no longer the same.
143	11	"Siren"	Kevin G. Fair	Kelly Souders & Brian Peterson	February 7, 2008	3T6311	4.01
Things have been awkward between Clark and Lana, who aren't sure they can still be together. Chloe intercepts confidential information from Lex, but Dinah Lance (Alaina Huffman) shows up and steals the information back for Lex. When Lex learns Green Arrow (Justin Hartley) was involved, he sends Dinah after him. Lionel asks Lana to dig up dirt on Lex proving he killed Grant, but she refuses, warning him it is too dangerous. Dinah attacks Green Arrow/Oliver Queen, believing him to be a terrorist, and in the process reveals his secret identity to Lois. Clark confronts Dinah and convinces her of the truth. Later, Oliver tries to rekindle his relationship with Lois, who tearfully declines, saying she cannot be left behind again. Oliver offers Dinah a spot on his team and she accepts. Clark tells Lana he is not sure they will end up together, but he wants to trust each other again, and that he isn't ready for them to be over yet.
144	12	"Fracture"	James Marshall	Story by : Al Septien & Turi Meyer; Teleplay by : Caroline Dries	February 14, 2008	3T6312	3.67
Lois discovers that Lex has found Kara, who is suffering from amnesia, and follows him to Detroit after her. Finley (Corey Sevier), the busboy at the diner that Kara works, is obsessed with her, and when Lex arrives, Finley shoots him, fearing that he will take Kara away. He then holds Kara and Lois hostage. Clark, in efforts to find them, enters Lex's mind using experimental LuthorCorp technology; here he discovers Lex's good side, child Alexander, is still alive. Chloe uses her powers to bring Lex back from the dead, which leaves her dead for eighteen hours. In the aftermath, Lionel tells Lex he loves him, Kara returns to Smallville, and Clark tries to remind Lex he can still be good. Clark warns Chloe that her powers are dangerous and they question if she should use them and why she was gifted them. Lex and Kara talk, where she says she feels like Clark is keeping things from her. He laments that he is no longer friends with Clark since he grew up, and that she should let him help her get her memories back, so they can learn the truth once and for all.
145	13	"Hero"	Michael Rohl	Aaron & Todd Helbing	March 13, 2008	3T6313	3.80
Pete Ross (Sam Jones III) chews some kryptonite-laced gum and develops the ability to stretch his body to extreme lengths, which he uses to save Kara's life from a falling speaker at a OneRepublic concert in an abandoned warehouse. Pete arrives at the Kent farm and gets up to speed on who knows Clark's secret, before revealing his own power to Clark. Pete decides to reveal his ability to the world, against Clark and Chloe's advice, but Lex blackmails him into stealing Kara's bracelet from Lionel's safe. When Pete does not deliver, Lex tortures him. Clark arrives and saves Pete. No longer trusting Clark and Lana, and wanting to learn her true identity, Kara stays with Lex, while Clark secretly hides the bracelet.
146	14	"Traveler"	Glen Winter	Story by : Al Septien & Turi Meyer; Teleplay by : Don Whitehead & Holly Henderson	March 20, 2008	3T6314	3.44
Lionel hires a group of men led by Pierce (Aaron Douglas) to kidnap Clark, using kryptonite tazers to subdue him, and lock him in a kryptonite-lined cell. Dr. Virgil Swann's daughter Patricia (Gina Holden) comes looking for the "Last Son of Krypton" and accuses Lionel of taking the "Last Son" for himself and having a hand in the deaths of her father, the Teagues, and the Queens – three families who came together with Lionel, under a secret societal name of "Veritas", to welcome the "Last Son", the Traveler, to Earth. Chloe and Lana discover Lionel's actions, so they take Kara to Jor-El, who restores her memory. With her powers returned, Kara saves Clark. Patricia gives Clark her father's journal. Later, Lex has Patricia killed and a pendant she was wearing—which depicted the Veritas symbol—delivered to him.
147	15	"Veritas"	James Marshall	Kelly Souders & Brian Peterson	March 27, 2008	3T6315	3.86
Brainiac propositions Kara at the farm, but she refuses. Brainiac warns Kara and Clark that not working with him will cause people to get hurt. Jimmy and Lois work together to uncover the truth behind Patricia's murder. Lex begins searching for the secret of Veritas with a key he found in Patricia's pendant. Kara attempts to teach Clark to fly, but he is more focused on finding Brainiac who attacks Lana at the Isis Foundation. In order to save Lana's life, Kara agrees to help Brainiac. Lana is placed in a clinic, stuck in a catatonic state, while Clark and Chloe have no leads as to where Brainiac and Kara are.
148	16	"Descent"	Ken Horton	Don Whitehead & Holly Henderson	April 17, 2008	3T6316	3.61
Lex takes Lionel's locket, which holds the second key to the deposit box in Zürich, and then throws him out the LuthorCorp window to his death. Lex soon discovers the key is not where he thought, and heads to the Daily Planet to find it; he also begins having hallucinations of his younger self. Lex finds the key in Chloe's desk and then fires her. Jimmy and Lois discover that Lionel was murdered. Clark confronts Lex at the mansion, informing him that he has proof Lex murdered Lionel. Lex's assistant Gina (Anna Galvin) destroys the evidence and discovers Clark's secret. Before she can tell Lex everything, a mysterious stranger kills her.
149	17	"Sleeper"	Whitney Ransick	Caroline Dries	April 24, 2008	3T6317	3.62
In order to locate Brainiac and Kara, Clark has Chloe hack into government satellites. The DDS has been monitoring Chloe's activity and, convinced she is a terrorist, convince Jimmy to work with them to bring her down. Clark decides to head to the Fortress to find a way to save Lana, where he learns that Kara is at Krypton trying to warn Clark that Brainiac intends to kill the infant version of Kal-El. The DDS agents have Jimmy accompany Chloe to a club, which is a front for a security building, to find out who her target is. They catch Chloe stealing satellite images and begin interrogating her. Jimmy shows up and saves her life, and agrees to do whatever Lex wants in exchange for clearing Chloe's name with the government.
150	18	"Apocalypse"	Tom Welling	Al Septien & Turi Meyer	May 1, 2008	3T6318	3.81
Jor-El sends Clark to an alternate reality to show him what the world would be like if he never arrived on Earth. Here, the Kents have a natural-born son, Chloe is engaged, Lana married a French philanthropist, Lois is a Pulitzer Prize-winning journalist, Kara is the head of the DDS using the alias Linda Danvers, and Lex is the President of the United States. Here, he befriends Lois and a sexual and romantic tension is present. In this reality, Clark is unable to prevent Brainiac and Lex from detonating the country's nuclear missiles. After learning the world needs him, Clark is sent to Krypton to prevent Brainiac from killing him as an infant. After stopping Brainiac, which Kara does by killing him, Clark and Kara both return to present day Earth. Lex stops by to tell Clark there is nothing any of his doctors can do to save Lana. Trying to cheer him up, Lois invites Clark out for a drink, much like she did in the alternate reality. Kara collapses after hearing a painful, high pitched sound.
151	19	"Quest"	Kenneth Biller	Holly Harold	May 8, 2008	3T6319	3.99
The bank teller from Zurich attacks Lex, carving the Kryptonian symbols for "Traveler", "Savior", and "Sanctuary" into his chest. After seeing the symbols, Clark travels to Montreal, Quebec, where he finds Jason Teague's father Edward (Robert Picardo), the only surviving member of Veritas. Edward deems that Clark is no savior and attempts to kill him so that Lex cannot control him, explaining that Jor-El knew the risks of sending a god to Earth and that Clark just as well could have been sent to destroy, so Jor-El sent the device to Earth so Clark could be controlled if he ever turned against them. Lex arrives and is greeted by Edward, who remarks that the prophecy stated the Traveler would have a great adversary, he just never suspected it to be him. Chloe saves Clark, who in turn saves Edward from Lex. Lex keeps the key he found. Jimmy sells a story to Lex about his research of the cave symbols, when he learns that the symbols that parallel Lex and Clark, the battle between the hero and antihero, cultivate the hero's journey in a final battle. Chloe suggests to Clark that he should kill Lex. Lex returns home and discovers an orb hidden inside the mantle above the fireplace. The orb gives the location of the Fortress.
152	20	"Arctic"	Todd Slavkin	Don Whitehead & Holly Henderson	May 15, 2008	3T6320	3.85
Kara informs Lex that he will defeat the Traveler, who is really destined to destroy mankind, and sends him to the Fortress. Clark learns that Brainiac has been impersonating Kara, who is actually stuck in the Phantom Zone, and destroys him to finally free Lana from her comatose state. Lana leaves Clark a DVD stating that she is holding Clark back, and the only way for him to help the world is if the two of them are not together. After Jimmy backs out of his deal with Lex, the DDS arrest Chloe just as Jimmy is about to propose marriage. Jimmy goes to Clark and tells him about the deal he made with Lex, also informing him that Lex is headed to the Arctic. Clark arrives at the Fortress just as Lex, who now knows Clark's secret, places the orb onto the crystal control panel, bringing the Fortress down around him and Clark.

== Cast and characters ==
=== Main ===
- Tom Welling as Clark Kent
  - Welling also portrays Bizarro in three episodes
- Michael Rosenbaum as Lex Luthor
- Kristin Kreuk as Lana Lang (Note: Absent in four episodes)
- Allison Mack as Chloe Sullivan
- Erica Durance as Lois Lane (Note: Absent in eight episodes)
- Aaron Ashmore as Jimmy Olsen
- Laura Vandervoort as Kara Kent (Note: Absent in seven episodes)
- John Glover as Lionel Luthor

=== Recurring ===
- Anna Galvin as Gina
- Terence Stamp as the voice of Jor-El
- Michael Cassidy as Grant Gabriel
- James Marsters as Brainiac / Milton Fine

== Production ==
=== Writer's strike ===
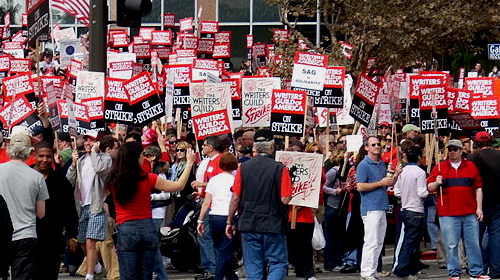
The Writers Guild form picket lines as they protest their contracts with the Alliance of Motion Picture and Television Producers.

On November 5, 2007, a strike began between the Writers Guild of America, East (WGAE), Writers Guild of America, West (WGAW) and the Alliance of Motion Picture and Television Producers (AMPTP). A prolonged strike would have forced television shows to end their seasons early, because no scripts could be written until a settlement had been reached. The strike pushed back Smallville's scheduling, as the episode "Siren", which was originally intended to be aired on January 10, 2008, was moved to a February 7 airdate. According to developers and showrunners Alfred Gough and Miles Millar, they were able to complete the scripts for 15 episodes and the studio planned to produce all of them. They also explained that the fifteenth episode would have had a cliffhanger ending. The shortened schedule also meant Allison Mack would not see her directorial debut for the season's 20th episode as was originally planned. On February 12, 2008, after a 48-hour vote by the guild members, the strike came to an end. This allowed the shooting of five new episodes that began airing on April 17. This was in addition to the episodes that had already been filmed, leaving the season total at 20 episodes.

=== Characters ===
For season seven, the Smallville team would bring in two new regular cast members, Jimmy Olsen, who first appeared as a recurring guest in season six, and Kara, Clark Kent's biological cousin. In July 2007, Canadian actress Laura Vandervoort was cast to portray Kara. According to Gough and Millar, her backstory is that she was sent to look after Kal-El, but was stuck in suspended animation for eighteen years. When the dam broke in the season six finale "Phantom", she was set free. She has all of Clark's abilities, as well as the ability to fly. Gough iterated that Kara will not wear any version of the Supergirl costume. At the same time, Michael Cassidy was cast as the new editor of the Daily Planet, Grant Gabriel. Grant was designed to be Lois Lane' new love interest; he appeared in seven episodes.

Smallville also brought in more actors with previous connections to the Superman lore. Helen Slater, who portrayed Supergirl in the 1984 film of the same name, was cast as Lara, Clark's biological mother. She made appearances in episodes six and eight, titled "Lara" and "Blue", respectively. Dean Cain, who played Superman in Lois & Clark: The New Adventures of Superman (1993–1997), had a guest role as "evil Dr. Curtis Knox" in the fourth episode "Cure". Marc McClure, who portrayed Jimmy Olsen in all of the Superman films as well as in Supergirl, was brought in to play a Kryptonian scientist named Dax-Ur for the episode "Persona". James Marsters was brought back to reprise his role as Milton Fine / Brainiac in a four-episode arc slated for January 2008; Marsters had not appeared on the show since the season five finale "Vessel". Another character from the DC Comics universe arriving on Smallville was the Black Canary. The character was intended to be featured in the January 10, 2008 episode "Siren", but the Writers' Strike pushed scheduling back to February 7. Black Canary was portrayed by Canadian actress Alaina Huffman, and the episode featured the return of Justin Hartley as Oliver Queen / Green Arrow. This season also saw the return of former series regular Sam Jones III as Pete Ross, after a four-year absence.

== Tie-ins ==
In 2008, The CW entered into a partnership with the makers of Stride brand chewing-gum to give viewers the opportunity to create their own Smallville digital comic, titled Smallville: Visions. The writers and producers developed the comic's beginning and end, but allowed viewers to provide the middle. The CW began this tie-in campaign with the March 13 episode "Hero", where Pete Ross develops superhuman elasticity after chewing some kryptonite-infused Stride gum. Going to The CW's website, viewers voted on one of two options—each adding four pages to the comic—every Tuesday and Thursday until the campaign ended on April 7. For season seven, Smallville again worked with Sprint, bringing its customers "mobisodes" featuring Clark's cousin Kara, titled Smallville Legends: Kara and the Chronicles of Krypton.

== Reception ==
The season premiere was watched by 5.18 million viewers, marking an increase from the previous season finale, "Phantom", which was viewed by 4.14 million. "Bizarro" and "Cure" were also the highest-rated episodes of the season, both being seen by 5.18 million viewers and scoring a 1.8 in the Nielsen rating in the 2 year old and up demographic. Nielsen ratings are audience measurement systems that determine the audience size and composition of television programming in the United States. This means that the episodes were seen by 1.8 percent of all viewers in the United States watching television at the time of the episode's airing that were older than 2 years old. The season hit a low with the fourteenth episode, "Traveler", which was watched by only 3.44 million viewers. The season finale, "Arctic", was viewed by 3.85, marking a decrease from both the season premiere and the sixth-season finale. Smallville's season seven slipped in the ratings, averaging 3.7 million viewers weekly. Smallville ranked as the 175th most-watched television series, out of 220, for the 2007–08 television year.

== Awards ==
"Bizarro" was nominated for a VES award in Outstanding Compositing in a Broadcast Program or Commercial, specifically for the flood scene; it was also nominated for, and won the Emmy Award for Outstanding Sound Editing for a Series. In 2009, the season received five Teen Choice Awards nominations. The nominations include Choice TV Show: Action Adventure, Choice TV Actor: Action Adventure for Welling, Choice TV Actress: Action Adventure for Kreuk, Choice TV: Villain for Rosenbaum, and Choice TV: Sidekick for Mack.

== Home media release ==
The complete seventh season of Smallville was released on September 9, 2008, in North America in both DVD and Blu-ray format. The DVD and Blu-ray box set were also released in region 2 and region 4 on October 13, 2008, and March 3, 2009, respectively. The box set included various special features, including episode commentary, a documentary on the Supergirl character, a featurette on the different actors to portray Jimmy Olsen, as well as mobisodes for Smallville Legends.
