= Smallville season 6 =

Season of television series

Smallville
- Season 6
- DVD and Blu-ray cover featuring Tom Welling, Michael Rosenbaum, and Kristin Kreuk
- Showrunners: Alfred Gough; Miles Millar
- Starring: Tom Welling; Kristin Kreuk; Michael Rosenbaum; Erica Durance; Allison Mack; John Glover; Annette O'Toole
- No. of episodes: 22

Release
- Original network: The CW
- Original release: September 28, 2006 – May 17, 2007

Season chronology
- ← Previous; Season 5 Next → Season 7

The sixth season of Smallville, an American television series developed by Alfred Gough and Miles Millar, began airing on September 28, 2006 on The CW. The series recounts the early adventures of Kryptonian Clark Kent as he adjusts to life in the fictional town of Smallville, Kansas, during the years before he becomes Superman. The sixth season comprises 22 episodes and concluded its initial airing on May 17, 2007, marking the first season to air on the newly formed The CW television network. Regular cast members during season six include Tom Welling, Kristin Kreuk, Michael Rosenbaum, Erica Durance, Allison Mack, John Glover, and Annette O'Toole.

Season six key story arcs involve Clark (Welling) trying to recapture several escaped criminals from the Phantom Zone, the destinies of Lionel Luthor (Glover) and Lex Luthor (Rosenbaum) following the aftermath of Lex's possession by General Zod and Lionel's adoption as the emissary of Jor-El, and the introductions of DC Comics characters Jimmy Olsen, Oliver Queen, and Martian Manhunter. Other key storylines involve Lana Lang (Kreuk) and Lex's marriage, as well as Lex's secret 33.1 projects.

Smallville's season six slipped in the ratings, averaging 4.1 million viewers weekly. It was nominated for an Emmy Award, among other awards, in the category of Outstanding Sound Editing For A Series for the episode "Zod".

== Episodes ==
No. overall	No. in season	Title	Directed by	Written by	Original release date	Prod. code	U.S. viewers (millions)
111	1	"Zod"	James Marshall	Steven S. DeKnight	September 28, 2006	2T7701	4.96
Zod, in Lex's body, turns the power back on intent on using a Pentagon Satellite to destroy and rebuild Earth as New Krypton with Lana. Clark, still stuck in the Phantom Zone, gets help from his father's assistant Raya (Pascale Hutton) in escaping, while Nam-Ek (Leonard Roberts) is killed during the conflict. Martha saves Lois' life with Jor-El's (voiced by Terence Stamp) help after crashing at the Fortress. Chloe runs into former flame Jimmy Olsen (Aaron Ashmore), a new intern photographer at the Daily Planet. Clark returns from the Phantom Zone and confronts Zod. Using the House of El crystal Raya gave him, Clark defeats Zod. Lex has no memory of the damage he caused or anything that happened. Chloe and Clark do not continue a relationship. Lionel begins translating Kryptonian letters. Lex finds a piece of Zod's weapon and keeps it. Clark realizes Jor-El is gone and that his life is all changing fast. It is revealed other Phantom Zone criminals escaped with Clark and are scattered throughout the world.
112	2	"Sneeze"	Paul Shapiro	Todd Slavkin & Darren Swimmer	October 5, 2006	2T7702	4.52
Clark spends his nights helping the rebuilding effort of Metropolis. When Clark develops a cold, he discovers a new super power. An inadvertent sneeze blows the barn door off its hinges and across town, nearly striking a jogging Lois. While seeking the truth behind the falling door, Lois discovers a new love for investigative journalism. Oliver Queen (Justin Hartley), one of Lex's old classmates, moves to Metropolis. He has Lex captured to investigate Lex's powers but instructs his assistant to find who saved Lex.
113	3	"Wither"	Whitney Ransick	Tracy Bellomo	October 12, 2006	2T7703	4.88
Lex throws a costume charity ball that The All-American Rejects perform at to help raise funds for the restoration process after "Dark Thursday", the day Zod appeared. Lana has conflicting feelings about trusting Lex and she confides in Chloe. Clark learns that others have escaped the Phantom Zone when he and Chloe discover Gloria (Amber McDonald), a park ranger, is kidnapping men to harbor her alien seeds. She is defeated with electricity. Lois takes a job working for a paper. Oliver takes Lois out to the benefit and a romance is hinted at with them. Lana and Lex have their first time together.
114	4	"Arrow"	Michael Rohl	Brian Peterson & Kelly Souders	October 19, 2006	2T7704	4.71
Oliver, dressed in his hero costume, crashes Lionel's party for Martha's U.S. Senate bid, and steals a priceless necklace from Martha. Clark goes to Metropolis to find the necklace, and quickly discovers that Oliver is the thief. Oliver also learns of his powers. Lois believes she has landed a new front page story with the Inquisitor, calling the thief "Green Arrow", but her story is ruined when he steals her only evidence. Oliver reveals that the jewelry was all stolen off the dark web. When Lois is kidnapped by a client who wants Arrow's identity, Oliver saves her. Elsewhere, Lana learns Lex is investigating the piece of Zod's weapon and Lionel wants her to destroy it. However, she goes behind his back and sides with Lex. In the end, it is all revealed to be a test by Lex. Oliver propositions Clark to form a team with him.
115	5	"Reunion"	Jeannot Szwarc	Steven S. DeKnight	October 26, 2006	2T7706	4.79
Lex and Oliver attend their ten year reunion, where the animosity between them is obviously rising as talk of Lex's deceased best friend Duncan (Bryce Hodgson) brings tension. When Oliver's old friends begin to die one by one, he starts an investigation into who is responsible and find that an older Duncan (Damon Schwabach-Morris) is responsible and kept alive in a vegetative state where Lionel's doctors experimented with kryptonite that enabled Duncan to have astral projection abilities. Oliver gives Clark the satellite images from "Dark Thursday" in exchange for helping him find out who is killing his friends. Lex demands to see Duncan's treatment information and Clark learns Raya is still alive.
116	6	"Fallout"	Glen Winter	Holly Harold	November 2, 2006	2T7707	5.01
An escaped phantom named Baern takes possession of the body of a young boy (Bow Wow) and sets his sights on finding Kal-El. As Clark is studying the satellite images, he gets an unexpected visit from Raya, who warns Clark to complete his destiny and shares stories of his father. The escaped "Zoner" locates Clark and arrives at the Kent farm, but is forced to retreat. Baern returns with more power after absorbing what is revealed to be Brainiac's power cell. This leaves an already at odds Lex and Lana strained who both want different things with the research related to it. After Raya is fatally injured, Clark uses the House of El crystal to capture Baern. Raya tells Clark to restore the Fortress' power as she dies, sad she could not share his destiny with him. Motivated by her death, Clark realizes he wishes he could have had his life on Krypton and that he feels alone. Motivated, he realizes he is ready for his training but he must first defeat the remaining Zoners.
117	7	"Rage"	Whitney Ransick	Todd Slavkin & Darren Swimmer	November 9, 2006	2T7708	4.46
Oliver bails on Lois when a couple is being mugged at gunpoint. While attempting to stop the muggers, Oliver is shot. When Clark checks in on Oliver, Oliver has no visible signs of being shot. Clark and Chloe discover that Oliver's research facility is developing a drug that heals almost any wound instantly. LuthorCorp is secretly funding the project and Lex has the scientist killed when she wants to pull the drug. The drug is making Oliver fall into a rage-induced psychosis which ends when he kills Lex who is only saved by Clark injecting him with the drug. Martha and Lionel deal with feelings for each other and Martha's wish to have him at Thanksgiving. Lana learns that she is pregnant. Clark struggles with taking over Jonathan's role at Thanksgiving but ultimately melancholically accepts the role.
118	8	"Static"	James Conway	Shintaro Shimosawa & James Morris	November 16, 2006	2T7709	4.70
Level 33.1 patient Bronson (Elias Toufexis) breaches the mansion and kidnaps Lex, transporting him to another frequency plane with the use of his frequency manipulation abilities. Level 33.1 is where Lex runs tests on people exposed to meteor rocks. Despite this, Lana does not seem phased. Lionel has 33.1 moved to cover their tracks. Clark learns of another escaped Phantom Zone criminal, Alder (Dave Bautista), and heads to Seattle to find him. Bronson kidnaps Lana, in an effort to force Lex to reveal the new location of 33.1. Jimmy triangulates their positions to pull them out, but not before Lex kills Bronson. Clark has his first encounter with the Martian Manhunter. Lex proposes to Lana after learning she is pregnant.
119	9	"Subterranean"	Rick Rosenthal	Caroline Dries	December 7, 2006	2T7705	4.31
Jed McNally (John Novak) is forcing illegal immigrants to work on his farm in Smallville. Javier (Tyler Posey) who has come to Kansas to search for his mother, manages to escape, but his friend gets pulled into the ground thanks to McNally's burrowing abilities during the attempt. McNally is arrested, but escapes by burrowing into the ground. Chloe and Jimmy locate Javier's mother. Clark defeats McNally who ends up comatose. Lex has McNally imprisoned in the newly relocated 33.1.
120	10	"Hydro"	Tom Welling	Brian Peterson & Kelly Souders	January 11, 2007	2T7710	4.68
Linda Lake (Tori Spelling), a gossip columnist with the ability to morph into water, uses her ability to uncover incriminating stories, including one about Lana, Lex, and Clark. Lana confides in Chloe that she still feels for Clark and Clark feels the same way. Lois suspects that Oliver is actually Green Arrow. She sets up an elaborate scheme to catch him, but Clark dresses up as Green Arrow and while in disguise, shares a passionate kiss with Lois, which both enjoy. Chloe and Linda get into a fight, when Chloe discovers Linda's new story about Clark. The fight leads to Lana hitting her with her car seemingly killing her, but Lana almost hears Clark's secret and becomes suspicious of Chloe and Clark. Clark learns about Lana's pregnancy and now realizes everything has changed. Lana finally accepts Lex's proposal.
121	11	"Justice"	Steven S. DeKnight	Steven S. DeKnight	January 18, 2007	2T7711	5.26
Bart Allen (Kyle Gallner), Arthur Curry (Alan Ritchson), and Victor Stone (Lee Thompson Young) return to Smallville with Oliver with the goal of dismantling 33.1. Oliver believes Lex is amassing an army of kryptonite-enhanced people in his level 33.1 projects and only the team can defeat the project. When Bart is captured, Clark and the others, along with Chloe's help acting as "Watchtower", band together to rescue him and destroy Lex's facility. After completing their mission, Oliver says goodbye to Lois, ending their relationship, and leaves town with Bart, Arthur, and Victor in search of Lex's other 33.1 facilities. Oliver notes he is thinking of calling the team something with "Justice" in it and Clark promises to join them as the team heads off to save the world.
122	12	"Labyrinth"	Whitney Ransick	Al Septien & Turi Meyer	January 25, 2007	2T7712	5.00
Clark is attacked by a "Zoner", but when he wakes up he finds himself in a sanitarium without powers. He is informed by Dr. Hudson (Matthew Walker) that his entire life, as he believes it, has been nothing more than a fabrication he created to cope with his biological parents' death in the meteor shower. He is not an alien and did not save Lex, Lana never dated Whitney Fordman, Martha is married to Lionel, and Chloe seemingly believes Clark but is killed. Another patient, the Martian Manhunter (Phil Morris), tries to help Clark, warning him that the phantom is actually attempting to take over Clark's body with his mind-control abilities. The phantom tries to use Clark's love of Lana as means to make him give in and stay in the world forever but he ultimately kills the doctor and wakes up to Martian Manhunter pulling the phantom from his body. Clark realizes he still loves Lana and tells Chloe how she was the only one who believed in him and that she means a lot to him.
123	13	"Crimson"	Glen Winter	Brian Peterson & Kelly Souders	February 1, 2007	2T7713	4.91
During a Valentine's Day party, Lois is given a tube of lipstick laced with red kryptonite, designed to cause her to fall in love with the first person she sees. When Lois kisses Clark, he becomes immediately affected. Clark and Lois almost hookup and he shows her his powers before deciding to crash Lana and Lex's engagement party. There, Clark shares how he feels about everyone. He makes it known he hates Lex and tells him that he wishes he never saved him on the bridge. He exposes that Lana is pregnant and then takes her to the barn where he tells her he is still in love with her and he knows she is still in love with him. They kiss and Lana hesitates, but Clark pleads with her to marry him. Lex arrives and Clark shares how Lana kissed him and still loves him. Chloe and Martha quickly realize the truth and grab some green kryptonite to neutralize the effects. Before they can, a fight with Lex ensues and Clark nearly murders Lex. Lex stabs Clark with a chisel as Martha knocks him down with kryptonite. As Lana rushes away she sees the chisel is bent. In the aftermath, Jimmy breaks up with Chloe feeling inferior to Clark. Lex is revealed to be faking Lana's pregnancy, unbeknownst to her, and Lana saves the chisel.
124	14	"Trespass"	Michael Rohl	Tracy A. Bellomo	February 8, 2007	2T7714	4.74
While Lana continues her investigation into Clark, someone else begins stalking her. No matter where she goes, they continue to find her, leaving her gifts and death threats. Lana begins to fear for her safety. She stays with Martha and uses the opportunity to learn more about Clark. When she returns to the mansion, Lana is surprised to learn the true identity of the stalker: Lex's security guard Mack (Jordan Belfi). Mack confesses that Lex is turning Lana into him and corrupting her and he wishes to save her from that. This leads to a struggle on the roof on Lex's mansion which ends with Mack falling through the skywindow to his death. Lana almost perished in the fall but is saved by Clark, who reveals to her he knows she has been watching him but that he is still watching her for the same reason. Jimmy and Chloe get back together. Lex confronts Clark about their fight and then invites him to the wedding so he can see what he has lost.
125	15	"Freak"	Michael Rosenbaum	Todd Slavkin & Darren Swimmer	February 15, 2007	2T7715	4.76
Tobias (Greyston Holt), a young man who was blinded in the last meteor shower, is being used to identify kryptonite-enhanced individuals so that LuthorCorp can place tracking devices in all of them. Unaware of what is really happening, he identifies Chloe as being kryptonite-infected. Chloe is kidnapped and tests are done on her, and a tracker is ultimately put in her. Chloe, however, doesn't remember the kidnapping. Lana has come to the realization that Clark is meteor-infected and is supportive to his secret. Clark steals Lex's doctor's laptop with all the information on 33.1 and since it has incriminating evidence, they start killing every patient they have ever worked on. Chloe learns she is a "meteor freak", just as she and Clark find out that LuthorCorp is killing everyone, so Clark is forced to burn the tracker out of her. Lana visits Tobias because she is worried he might tell someone about Clark's secret, but Tobias says that he is not infected. When the two are almost murdered by the doctor, Clark saves the day but Lana is left suspicious. Clark learns that he does not appear infected and Lana tells him it wouldn't matter if he was. Lex lies to Lana about his involvement. Fearing what she will become, Clark promises to look after Chloe and any potential power she may develop. Lex watches a tape of Chloe being experimented on and instructs an unknown person to keep a close eye on her.
126	16	"Promise"	Rick Rosenthal	Kelly Souders & Brian Peterson	March 15, 2007	2T7716	4.69
Lana begins having second thoughts about her marriage to Lex, and finally decides to find out the truth about Clark. She has also come to realize he is the one who saved her so many times and from the tornado. After learning the truth, by way of deception, Lana promises Clark that she isn't going to marry Lex. Lionel realizes what is going on and forces Lana to walk down the aisle. He reveals he knows she knows Clark's secret but says that he knows with his weaknesses. He says that if she does not marry Lex he will kill Clark. Lex kills Dr. Langston (Fred Henderson), who he is using to fake Lana's pregnancy, when he tries to blackmail him. Clark prepares to propose to Lana, but is unaware that she knows the truth, and is heartbroken when he watches her marry Lex. After the wedding, he begs her to be with him and even almost tells her his secret so she will be with him, but she tearfully reaffirms her love for Lex. Lionel lets Lex know he knows he killed the doctor and says he is going to be collecting something from him. Clark and Lana share one final glance as she rides off with Lex.
127	17	"Combat"	James Marshall	Turi Meyer & Al Septien	March 22, 2007	2T7717	4.07
Since Lana's wedding, Clark has devoted himself to bringing wanted criminals to justice, by any means necessary. Getting a tip from Oliver, Clark learns about an underground fighting ring where Titan (Kane), an escaped Phantom Zone criminal, has taken up fighting krypto-warriors. Clark joins the fighting ring to take on Titan. Lois investigates the ring and gets herself in too deep, being forced to fight criminals. Lana supposedly suffers a miscarriage. Clark has to kill Titan to save himself and Lois and struggles with the thought of having to kill all the remaining zoners and the rage he felt when fighting Titan. Martha comforts him and says that the rage is about Lana's wedding. Clark comes to the conclusion that someone made the decision for Lana to marry Lex and that he must figure out what happened but Martha advises him to let go. Lana learns that Langston was killed and apologizes to Lex for losing the baby while declaring she has to get the files from Langston. Lex has all the files and any evidence of the pregnancy destroyed.
128	18	"Progeny"	Terrence O'Hara	Genevieve Sparling	April 19, 2007	2T7718	3.98
Chloe's mother Moira (Lynda Carter) wakes from her catatonic state with some help from Lex, who is interested in her ability to control meteor-enhanced people. Moira quickly begins controlling Chloe in an effort to break out of Lex's facility. With some help from Clark, she is able to see her daughter again. Without Lex's drugs, she slips back into catatonia. Clark tries to find out from Lana what made her marry Lex, but she keeps up the ruse. With the baby gone, however, she confirms she doesn't want this life anymore. Lana learns the truth about her pregnancy: she was never pregnant at all. Chloe tries to expose Lex for what they are doing to people like her mother but he threatens to have her arrested for what she did when under her mother's control and if she refuses that offer, he says he already has a plan in place that will cause her great suffering. Clark and Chloe plan to get revenge on Lex but only after Lana is safe as Clark declares that a war is about to begin.
129	19	"Nemesis"	Mairzee Almas	Caroline Dries	April 26, 2007	2T7719	3.88
Jodi Keenan (Emily Holmes), the wife of special forces soldier Wes Keenan (Tahmoh Penikett), kidnaps Lex in an effort to get her husband back from LuthorCorp and hides him in an abandoned tunnel system with bombs planted throughout. Lionel convinces Clark to go in after Lex, warning him that Lex is working on a Project Ares that is "horrible" and must be stopped. Lex tells Jodi that Wes is dead, dying from an experimental LuthorCorp drug, and she blows up the mines, killing herself. With the walls lined with kryptonite and only a short time before everything collapses, Clark and Lex are forced to work together to escape the tunnels. Lana, now knowing Lex orchestrated her pregnancy, angrily confronts Lionel about why he made her marry Lex to which he replies that he is protecting Clark. Clark tells Lex about how Lana was going to leave him, while Lex shares that Clark was the only real friend he ever had. When Clark gets trapped under some rubble, Lex saves him, noting that he wasn't going to let him die alone. Lex and Clark are just barely able to escape in time. Lionel shares with Lana that he is using her to keep close to Lex and that she must trust him, because Clark's life depends on it. Chloe tells Clark that Lana was going to let Lex die. Clark tells Martha how he saw a glimpse of the Lex that was his friend and ponders if he gave up on him too soon. Wes is revealed to be alive and being made into a super soldier by Lex.
130	20	"Noir"	Jeannot Szwarc	Brian Peterson & Kelly Souders	May 3, 2007	2T7721	3.59
One night at the Daily Planet, Lana is found shot after a night with Lionel, who apologizes to her for getting her involved. The same night, Jimmy is knocked unconscious and dreams he is a reporter for the Daily Planet in 1940. In his dream, Lana requests him to solve her murder as she believes her husband, Lex, is having her killed. In the end, Jimmy kills Lex because Lana wanted him dead so she can be with Clark. Clark is revealed to be an undercover detective who kills Lana when she shoots Jimmy. In the reality, Chloe and Jimmy try to figure out who shot Lana, but it is Lois and Lionel who discover that Lex is working with Senator Burke (Alan C. Peterson) on Project Ares. Lionel warns Lois that someone tried to kill Lana to protect Burke and she could be next. Chloe learns that Lionel forced Lana to marry Lex, and that he is using her to spy on Lex. Lana asks her not to tell Clark because his life is at stake. Clark immediately knows that Chloe is keeping something from him but she won't tell him and he realizes Lionel is manipulating her. Lex learns that the gun used to shoot Lana was his gun and that she must've been carrying it for her own protection. Jimmy is sent to Wisconsin on assignment.
131	21	"Prototype"	Mat Beck	Steven S. DeKnight	May 10, 2007	2T7720	3.43
Using the DNA harvested from meteor-infected individuals like the forcefield generation of the Twins, the invisibility of Graham Garrett, and the super-speed of Bart as well as the super-strength of Titan, Lex and Dr. Donovan Jamison (Gerard Plunkett) turn Wes Keenan into a supersoldier. Wes' first mission is to kill Burke, who has threatened to expose Lex's operation. Lois, who was close with Wes, witnesses him doing so and Lex orders her to be killed. Clark battles Wes and defeats him using his heat vision where Wes shuts down in Lois' arms. Though LuthorCorp operatives later makes off with Wes' body. Martha takes a job to move to Washington, D.C. to fill Burke's senate seat after his death. Clark promises to look after the farm and gives Martha his blessing. Lex threatens Lana after she listened in to his discussing Project Ares. Lois is determined to put a stop to Lex. Lex orders work to begin on a new supersolider and notes that this is just the beginning as he overlooks a room of clones.
132	22	"Phantom"	James Marshall	Todd Slavkin & Darren Swimmer	May 17, 2007	2T7722	4.14
Clark tells Lana the truth about his origins, and learns that Lionel forced her to marry Lex. Lana tells Clark that he is still the same man to her, but she has to leave Smallville because she is not safe from Lex. Lana tells Lex she is leaving him and he hits her. Clark attacks Lionel, but Martian Manhunter stops him, revealing Lionel is working as an emissary for Jor-El. Martian Manhunter reveals he has been watching over Clark his whole life. Lois discovers Lex's research facility and is fatally wounded; when Chloe finds her, her tears revive Lois but kills Chloe. Clark is ready to be with Lana but first must stop the last phantom. Lana tries to leave Smallville, but is caught in a car bomb. Lionel breaks the news to Clark that Lana is dead and Clark knows that Lex killed her. The last phantom possessing a boy named Philipe Lamont (Quinn Lord) raids the facility as Jamison is killed by it. A fleeing Lex is arrested for the murder of Lana. The phantom leaves his host where he copies Clark's DNA, makes a new body, and becomes a "bizarre" version of Clark. Lionel tries to use the kryptonite on Bizarro which doesn't work. In the final moments of the battle, the dam breaks with Lionel, Chloe, and Lois still inside. As the dam explodes, Clark is sent flying as "Bizarro" flies after him.

== Cast and characters ==
=== Main ===
- Tom Welling as Clark Kent
  - Welling also portrays Bizarro in "Phantom"
- Kristin Kreuk as Lana Lang (Note: Absent in one episode)
- Michael Rosenbaum as Lex Luthor
  - Rosenbaum also portrays Zod in Lex's body in "Zod"
- Erica Durance as Lois Lane (Note: Absent in nine episodes)
- Allison Mack as Chloe Sullivan
- John Glover as Lionel Luthor (Note: Absent in ten episodes)
- Annette O'Toole as Martha Kent (Note: Absent in four episodes)

=== Recurring ===
- Aaron Ashmore as Jimmy Olsen
- Justin Hartley as Oliver Queen / Green Arrow
- Fred Henderson as Dr. Langston
- Ben Ayres as Jason Bartlett

== Tie-ins ==
In a promotional tie-in with Sprint, Smallville Legends: The Oliver Queen Chronicles was released. The six-episode CGI series chronicles the early life of Oliver Queen. According to Lisa Gregorian, Executive Vice President of worldwide marketing at Warner Bros. Television Group, these promotional tie-ins were ways to get fans more connected to the series. In April 2007, a tie-in with Toyota promoting their new Yaris featured an online comic strip as interstitial programs during new episodes of Smallville, titled Smallville Legends: Justice & Doom. The interactive comic was based on the episode "Justice", which follows the adventures of Oliver, Bart Allen, Victor Stone, and Arthur Curry—the initial members of the "Justice League" in Smallville—as they seek to destroy all of LuthorCorp's secret experimental labs. The online series allowed viewers to investigate alongside the fictional team, in an effort to win prizes. Stephan Nilson wrote all five of the episodes while working with a team of artists on the illustrations. The plot for each comic episode was given to Nilson as the production crew for Smallville was filming their current television episode. Artist Steve Scott drew comic book panels, which were then sent to a group called Motherland. That group reviewed the drawings and told Scott which images to draw on a separate overlay. This allowed for multiple objects to be moved in and out of the same frame.

== Awards ==
The sixth season was awarded Leo Awards in multiple categories. Make-up artist Natalie Cosco was awarded the Leo Award for Best Make-Up for her work on the episodes "Hydro" and "Wither". The show itself won Best Dramatic Series; James Marshall won Best Direction for "Zod"; Caroline Cranston won Best Costume Design for her work on "Arrow", and James Philpott won Best Production Design for "Justice". The American Society of Cinematographers honored the series with an award for the work done on "Arrow", and with an award for Glen Winter for his work on "Noir". Mack won Best Sidekick for the second year in a row when she took home the award in the 2007 Teen Choice Awards. The series was recognized by the Visual Effects Society with a 2007 VES Award nomination for Outstanding Visual Effects in the episode "Zod". The VES recognized the season in 2008, nominating "Justice" for Outstanding Compositing in a Broadcast Program or Commercial. In 2007, the sound effects and Foley teams were nominated for a Golden Reel Award for Best Sound Editing for their work on "Zod". David Moxness won the American Society of Cinematographers Outstanding Achievement in Cinematography Award for his work on "Arrow". In the 33rd Annual Saturn Awards, the show was nominated for Best Dramatic Television Series, as well as a Best Supporting Actress nomination for Mack.

== Home media release ==
The complete sixth season of Smallville was released on September 18, 2007, in North America. Additional releases in region 2 and region 4 took place on October 22, 2007, and March 5, 2008, respectively. This was the first season to be released on Blu-ray disc. The Blu-ray box set was released in the United States on September 18, 2007, and in Canada on October 9. Regions 2 and 4 received a release of October 13, 2008 and March 3, 2009, respectively. The box set included various special features, including episode commentary, "Ultimate Fan" featurette, a Green Arrow documentary, as well as mobisodes for the Oliver Queen Chronicles and Justice & Doom.
