= Chloe Sullivan =

Fictional character from Smallville

- Smallville character
- Allison Mack as Chloe Sullivan
- First appearance: "Pilot"; Smallville; October 16, 2001
- Last appearance: "Finale"; Smallville; May 13, 2011
- Created by: Alfred Gough & Miles Millar
- Portrayed by: Allison Mack
- First comic appearance (tie-in comic): Smallville: The Comic (November 2002)
- First comic appearance (DC Universe): Action Comics #893 (November 2010)

In-universe information
- Alias: "Watchtower"
- Relatives: Lois Lane (cousin)
- Affiliations: Smallville Torch; Daily Planet; Justice League; Isis Foundation

Chloe Anne Sullivan is a fictional character in the television series Smallville, based on the Superman and Superboy comics published by DC Comics. Portrayed by series regular Allison Mack, Chloe was an original character created exclusively for Smallville by series developers Alfred Gough and Miles Millar. Other than main protagonist Clark Kent, Chloe is the only main character to last the whole duration of the show, though Mack signed on for only five episodes in the tenth and final season. The character has also appeared in various literature based on Smallville, a web series, and was later adapted back into the original Superman comics that inspired Smallville.

In Smallville, Chloe is Clark Kent's best friend, Lois Lane's cousin, and the editor of the high school newspaper the Torch; she notices that the meteor rocks (kryptonite) are mutating the citizens of Smallville which she tracks on her "Wall of Weird". She generally teams up with friends Clark and Pete Ross to research and stop meteor-infected people from harming other citizens. In the first five seasons, Chloe harbors an unrequited love for Clark, but eventually accepts her place as his platonic friend and nothing more. In later seasons, Chloe discovers she herself has the metahuman power of empathic healing, though she apparently loses it after an encounter with the alien supervillain Brainiac. In terms of romantic storylines, after Jimmy Olsen (the same-named older brother of Superman supporting character James Bartholomew Olsen) is introduced to the show, he becomes Chloe's boyfriend and later husband, but the pair later divorces after a monster disrupts their wedding. In the show's final two seasons, Chloe finds love with Oliver Queen, otherwise known as the costumed vigilante-archer Green Arrow, whom she eventually marries and has a son with.

Chloe Sullivan has been characterized as independent, intelligent, curious, and somewhat impulsive by both the writers and the actress who portrays her. The latter two characteristics often cause Chloe to get into trouble with both her friends and with billionaire industrialists Lionel Luthor and his son Lex, two of the show's primary antagonists. Mack has been recognized with multiple award nominations and wins for her breakout portrayal of Chloe. Although the character crossed over into DC Comics' main continuity in 2010, her appearances were largely phased out during the 2011 The New 52 corporate reboot. In later years, the character's legacy became associated with real-world controversy following the April 2018 arrest and subsequent conviction of actress Allison Mack for racketeering related to her involvement in the NXIVM organization.

== Role in Smallville ==
Introduced in the series pilot, Chloe spends much of her time helping her best friend Clark Kent (Tom Welling) investigating the mutant citizens of Smallville. These individuals develop special abilities caused by the meteor rocks that fell to Smallville in 1989, and use them to commit crimes. It is established at the start of the first season that Chloe is an aspiring journalist and the editor of the school newspaper The Torch. Her journalistic curiosity—always wanting to "expose falsehoods" and "know the truth"—causes tension with her friends, especially when she is digging into Clark's past in the season two episode "Lineage". In the early seasons, Chloe hides the fact that she is deeply in love with Clark, although the feeling is not reciprocated; she confesses her love to Clark in season two's "Fever" while he is sick and unconscious, but to her dismay he calls out Lana Lang's name in his delirium. Her feelings and frustration for Clark get in the way of her better judgment as she betrays his trust in the season two finale, after witnessing him and Lana Lang (Kristin Kreuk) sharing a kiss in his barn, and agrees to uncover information on Clark for Lionel Luthor (John Glover) in exchange for a job at the Daily Planet.

Chloe and Clark patch their relationship in the season three episode "Whisper", after Clark discovers that she has been helping Lionel. When Chloe stops her investigation, Lionel not only has her blacklisted from the Daily Planet, but also fires her father from LuthorCorp. In season three's "Forsaken", Chloe decides to assist Lex Luthor (Michael Rosenbaum), Lionel's estranged son, with getting Lionel arrested for the past murder of Lex's grandparents; Chloe's hope is to get out from under Lionel's control. In the season three finale, the FBI place Chloe and her father in a safehouse in waiting for Lionel's trial, but the safe-house explodes once Chloe and her father enter and they are presumed dead. This prompts Chloe's maternal cousin Lois Lane (Erica Durance) to come to Smallville to investigate Chloe's death in the fourth season premiere. In season four's "Gone", Clark and Lois team-up and discover that Lex's security team had found the explosives in the safehouse and absconded Chloe and her father to safety before the bomb detonated, and that he has been hiding her ever since. After Chloe's testimony in the same episode, Lionel is convicted of murder and sentenced to life imprisonment. In the season four episode "Pariah", Chloe discovers Clark's secret when Clark's ostracized girlfriend Alicia Baker (Sarah Carter) decides that his secret needs to be exposed to the world in order for him to finally accept who he really is. Alicia expects Chloe to write an exposé about Clark, but Chloe decides that Clark kept his secret for a reason and decides not to write the story instead.

Chloe finally reveals to Clark in the season five premiere that she has known his secret, but that she wanted him to be comfortable enough to tell her on his own. At the same time, Clark reveals that he was not infected by the meteor rocks in Smallville, as Chloe initially suspected, but that he is in fact an alien who was sent to Earth as a baby during the meteor shower of 1989. In season five's "Thirst", Chloe earns her dream job at the Daily Planet, starting in the basement. In the season six episode "Justice", Chloe begins assisting Green Arrow (Justin Hartley) and his team of superheroes under the codename "Watchtower". In "Freak", she discovers she herself is meteor-infected, with an unknown ability, and begins to worry that she is a "time bomb" heading towards insanity. She later discovers in "Progeny" that her institutionalized mother, Moira Sullivan (Lynda Carter), is meteor-infected as well. In the season finale, Chloe learns that her special power lets her heal any wound and even reverse death, when it activates to save Lois. In season seven's "Descent", when Chloe attempts to keep information regarding "The Traveler" a secret from Lex, who is unaware that "The Traveler" is really Clark, he fires her from her job at the Daily Planet. When in "Sleeper", Lana falls into a catatonic state having been attacked by the Kryptonian artificial intelligence known as Brainiac (James Marsters). Chloe takes over Lana's Isis Foundation, a free clinic for individuals who have been infected by the meteor rocks. In the seventh season finale, Chloe is attacked by Brainiac, but her healing powers prevent him from harming her. When she returns home, Jimmy Olsen (Aaron Ashmore), her on-again-off-again boyfriend since season six, proposes marriage. Before Chloe can answer the Department of Domestic Security (DDS) appears and arrests her for hacking into the government database.

At the start of season eight, it is revealed that Chloe was not arrested by DDS, but Lex's security personnel impersonating DDS agents. While subjected to their tests, Chloe discovers that her altercation with Brainiac has apparently caused to her to lose her meteor-related powers, but instilled two new abilities: vast super intelligence and technopathy. Returning to Smallville, Chloe reopens the Isis Foundation. Though she loves Jimmy, she finds herself attracted to paramedic Davis Bloome (Samuel Witwer). In the episode "Abyss", Brainiac's infestation causes Chloe to lose her memories. Clark takes Chloe to his biological father Jor-El, who restores her memories. After Chloe marries Jimmy in "Bride", she is kidnapped by Doomsday, a genetically engineered killing machine bent on destroying Earth and becomes Brainiac's vessel once again. Brainiac attempts to drain the world of all its human knowledge but is stopped and removed from Chloe's body by the Legion, superheroes from the future, in "Legion". In "Hex", Chloe assumes the codename Watchtower full time because she feels her life needs more meaning. Chloe discovers that Davis is Doomsday in "Eternal". She attempts to assist Davis' suicide using kryptonite; when this fails, she stays by his side in order to keep Doomsday under control. In the episode "Beast", she and Davis leave town together; Chloe reasons it will protect Clark. In the season eight finale, she uses black kryptonite to separate Davis from Doomsday; Clark buries Doomsday beneath Metropolis. When Davis discovers that Chloe is still in love with Jimmy, he stabs Jimmy and attempts to kill Chloe; Jimmy impales him on a metal rod, and they both die. Chloe vows to keep the Watchtower Jimmy gave her as a wedding gift open, in the hope that all lost heroes—namely Oliver and his team—will find their way home.

At the start of the ninth season, using Oliver's money, Chloe transforms the Watchtower into an information fortress and superhero headquarters. In this capacity, she acquires a rival in Tess's computer expert Stuart Campbell (Ryan McDonell); her status as superhero information broker also makes her a target for Checkmate bosses Amanda Waller (Pam Grier) and Maxwell Lord (Gil Bellows). Over the course of the season, she grows romantically close to Oliver. In the season ten premiere, when Oliver is kidnapped by Suicide Squad leader Rick Flag (Ted Whittall), Chloe risks her own sanity by putting on the helmet of Doctor Fate to learn his location. With the information acquired from Fate's helmet, she organizes a switch for Oliver; in Flag's captivity, Chloe fakes suicide and goes off-the-grid. Chloe returns in "Collateral", and reveals that she has been helping Clark, Oliver, and the rest of the heroes while in hiding, having blackmailed the Suicide Squad into helping her. Afterward, she resumes her relationships with the show's protagonists. In the episode "Fortune", Chloe decides to move to Star City to return to journalism following her marriage to Oliver Queen. In a flashforward in the series finale, Chloe is now the mother to a young boy, but remains in touch with Clark and Lois.

== Portrayal ==
Chloe Sullivan was introduced by the show's creators to be a "Lois Lane archetype", as well as be Smallville's "outsider", which series developers Gough and Millar felt the show needed in order to have a character that notices the strange happenings in Smallville. She is the original creation of Al Gough and Miles Miller, having not been produced first in the DC Comics Universe, unlike the other main characters Clark Kent, Lana Lang, Lex Luthor and Pete Ross. When they first began developing the series, Gough and Millar had intended for Chloe to have an "ethnic background". After learning about Smallville from the show's casting director, Dee Dee Bradley, Allison Mack toyed with the idea of auditioning for the role of Lana Lang, but chose instead to audition for the role of Chloe Sullivan. Gough and Millar felt she had a "rare ability to deliver large chunks of expositionary [sic] dialogue conversationally", and decided to cast her against their initial intention to give the character an ethnic origin. According to Mack, the reason she got the role was because she went into her second audition with a "very flippant attitude". Kristen Bell also auditioned for the role of Chloe Sullivan; she would eventually go on to star in the television series Veronica Mars. Aside from Allison Mack, Roan Curtis portrayed Chloe as a child in the season six episode "Progeny", with Victoria Duffield portraying a young Chloe during junior high school in the eighth season episode "Abyss". Mack enjoyed the fact that her character was created specifically for the show, because she feels like she does not have to worry about being compared to someone else in the same role, which she likens to people comparing Michael Rosenbaum's performance as Lex Luthor to Gene Hackman's portrayal in the Superman film series of the 1970-80s. Mack only signed on for five episodes of the tenth and final season.

== Character development ==
=== Storyline progression ===
Allison Mack was disappointed that the character "lost some of her backbone" in the second season. The second season was about exploring Chloe's heart, and the idea of her being this "lovelorn […] angsty teenager". As Mack describes her, "Chloe was a little spineless and a little bit too much of a pushover in season two". Mack does believe that by the end of the season Chloe manages to get some of that integrity back. The actress likes to make sure that her character is kept "smart" and "ambitious", but at the end of season two Chloe's impulsiveness causes her to get stuck under Lionel's control, when she "spitefully" agrees to uncover Clark's secrets for Lionel Luthor after Clark is not honest with her about his newly established relationship with Lana.

For season three, Mack wanted the character to be given a major obstacle to overcome, something that would help the character mature. The obstacle in question became Lionel's control over Chloe, after she made a deal to spy on Clark. Allison Mack believes that Chloe is in her own comfort zone while she is working at the Torch, as she is in complete control, but likens Chloe being under Lionel's control to that of a "caged animal". When she ruins the lives of a mother and her son in season three's "Truth", after exposing the mother as a fugitive from the law, Chloe is forced to look deeper into her own self. Mack believes that this event was a turning point for Chloe's maturity; it is the moment that she realizes that there needs to be a line she should never cross. After it is revealed to Clark in the season five premiere that Chloe knows his secret, the character becomes a larger part of the storyline for the show. Knowing Clark's secret allowed Chloe to finally come to terms with her feelings for Clark, and recognize where their relationship will always be; Chloe's acceptance of her place in Clark's life provides a means for the two to have a more meaningful friendship, without the concerns of Chloe's unrequited love. According to Mack, Chloe has learned to evolve her love for Clark into something more "genuine" and "selfless".

For the actress, having Chloe become part of the meteor infected community in season six allowed Mack's character to continue to evolve. Mack views this transition as a means for her character to become more emotionally connected to those people—the meteor infected—she spent five seasons trying to expose to the public. Being infected by the meteors gives Chloe motivation to try to understand them and allows her to grow closer to Clark, as she can better understand what it feels like to live in a world where you have a special ability. Writer Holly Harold believes that, in addition to being infected by the meteor rocks, bringing Lois into the journalistic field also provides Chloe with a lot of ammunition for growth and development. Lois's presence at the Daily Planet allows Chloe the chance to reflect upon herself, and discover what things are most important to her – her career or her family and friends. The competition that Lois provides is beneficial, as it gives Chloe a chance to bring out the best in herself.

=== Characterization ===
Allison Mack characterizes Chloe as being a "misfit" during the first season; more of "a really smart girl with attitude". She goes on to describe Chloe as intelligent and independent. Another of Chloe's defining characteristics is her need to "expose falsehoods" and find the truth in every situation. The character is curious and wants to be honest with people. She is always trying to make sense of the situation. Next to her curiosity, her impulsiveness is a key characteristic that eventually leaves her under the control of Lionel Luthor, when she offers to uncover information on Clark for Lionel. The reason for this betrayal is based on Chloe's love for Clark. As Allison Mack explains, Chloe is so blinded by her love for Clark that she neglects to see all of the mistakes that he makes. It is this unrequited love for Clark that "drives Chloe to be as ambitious and as focused as she is".

A leading theory among audiences was that Chloe would eventually change her name to Lois Lane, Clark's wife in the comics, as she embodies various characteristics that Lois Lane has in the comic books. The creative team removed the notion that Chloe was going to turn into Clark's future wife when they introduced Lois Lane in season four. Though the characters share similarities, according to Mack, Chloe and Lois are more "different shades of the same color […] Chloe is a softer version of Lois". Chloe's upbringing allows her to be less jaded than Lois. Chloe also looks to the future, whereas Lois is more shortsighted.

The season six finale reveals that Chloe has the ability to heal others. Mack describes Chloe's newfound meteor power as similar to "empathy". The actress further defines the power as the ability to heal others by taking their pain and making it her own. Writer Todd Slavkin contends that giving Chloe the power to heal was the best choice for the character. According to Slavkin, Chloe has sacrificed so much in her life for the greater good that it only seemed natural that her meteor power would reflect that. For the writer, it did not make sense for her ability to be something "malicious, evil and destructive". In season eight, Chloe discovers that she also has super-intelligence – being able to solve complex algorithms faster than LuthorCorp's most powerful supercomputer. She and Clark later deduce that her newfound intelligence was brought on during her encounter with Brainiac, who infected her with a part of himself during his attack.

=== Relationships ===
One of Chloe's key relationships is with the series protagonist, Clark Kent. Although believers in the "Chlois" theory initially suspected that Chloe would eventually become Lois Lane, Clark's future wife in the comics, Mack contends that Clark does not love Chloe in the way that she loves him. The actress does not believe that Clark's feelings will ever change. Regardless of Clark's feelings, Mack recognizes that Chloe is blinded by her love for Clark, which ultimately affects her judgment in not only seeing Clark's faults, but making choices that place her character in danger. In season five, Clark finally discovers that Chloe knows his secret, and this revelation allows Chloe the opportunity to come to terms with her feelings for Clark; this also provided a means for the two have a more meaningful friendship, without the concerns of Chloe's unrequited love.

Speaking on the evolving relationship of Clark and Chloe, Mack believes that the season six introduction of Jimmy Olsen into Chloe's life increased her value to Clark. Before, Chloe would drop anything for Clark, but now that Chloe has other priorities, it makes Clark realize how valuable she is to him. The introduction of Jimmy Olsen also provides Chloe with someone she can finally have a romantic relationship with. The relationship is strained when Chloe has to lie to cover up Clark's secret, as well as keeping the fact that she is meteor-infected hidden. Writer Holly Harold questions whether or not Jimmy has taken over the place in Chloe's heart that Clark occupied for so long.

Chloe's relationship with her mother is one tackled both off-screen and behind the scenes. In a brainstorming session, Mack, Gough and Millar came up with the idea that Chloe's mother had left her at a young age. Mack wanted to make the character a "latchkey kid", in an effort to explain why she is out all hours of the night. Mack feels that Chloe has real abandonment issues, which play on the fact that she never feels like she is good enough for anyone. These abandonment issues were meant to provide a reason for why the character is devastated by the fact that Clark does not love her the same way that she loves him, as well as the reason for why Chloe does not have many female friends. One of Chloe's story arcs in season five involved her finding her mother in a mental institution, and living with the fear that she will have a mental breakdown of her own and end up in a psychiatric facility. This fear also affects Clark, who worries that keeping his secret will have negative effects on Chloe, like it did Pete.

== Reception ==
Allison Mack has been nominated for a number of awards for her role as Chloe Sullivan. She was nominated for a Saturn Award as best supporting actress in a television program in 2006 and 2007. Mack has been nominated seven consecutive times—between 2002 and 2009—for Teen Choice Award's Choice Teen Sidekick; she won the award in 2006 and 2007.

== Other media appearances ==
Apart from her appearances on television, Chloe has also appeared in her own online spin-off, a series of young adult novels, a bi-monthly Smallville comic book, and been given a 2010 introduction into the official DC comics universe.

=== Chloe Chronicles ===
Apart from the television series Smallville, the character of Chloe Sullivan appeared in her own web-based spin-off series, titled Smallville: Chloe Chronicles. Allison Mack continued her duties as the investigative, high school reporter, with the series originally airing exclusively on AOL.com. The first volume aired between April 29 and May 20, 2003. The web series eventually made its way to Britain's Channel 4 website. Smallville: Chloe Chronicles was created by Mark Warshaw, with the scripts written by Brice Tidwell; Allison Mack was given final script approval. This final approval allowed Mack to review and make changes to the script as she saw fit. Warshaw also communicated regularly with Gough and Millar so that he could find more unique ways to expand Smallville stories over to Chloe's Chronicles.

"I think it's a bit more like The X-Files or NYPD Blue. The Chronicles are like a detective story, with Chloe following clues and interviewing people, going from spot to spot, figuring things out".

— Allison Mack describes Chloe Chronicles.

In the first volume, picking up some time after the events of season one's "Jitters", Chloe begins checking into the rumors of the "Level 3" facility at the Smallville LuthorCorp plant. Here, she starts investigating the death of LuthorCorp employee Earl Jenkins, which takes her to a research company known as Nu-Corp. Chloe interviews Nu-Corp's Dr. Arthur Walsh, who reveals that he knows what really happened to Earl Jenkins while he was working at LuthorCorp. Walsh disappears before Chloe can get all of the information.

In volume two, Chloe is contacted by an ex-Navy SEAL, Bix, and former member of LuthorCorp's "Deletion Group" who has information regarding Dr. Walsh's disappearance. Walsh begins sending Chloe videos, which lead Chloe to discover that Walsh was working with Donovan Jameson, the head of Nu-Corp, and Dr. Stephen Hamilton on experimentations involving the meteor rocks. Chloe and Pete Ross (Sam Jones III), who accompanies Chloe as her cameraman, learn that Jameson is experimenting on meteor infected people in order to steal their abilities. Jameson, exhibiting the same jitters as Earl Jenkins, attempts to kill Chloe and Pete to hide what he has been doing, but his jitters become uncontrollable and he kills himself in his lab. As Chloe and Pete leave the lab they come across Lionel Luthor, leading Chloe to realize that Lionel was funding Jameson's efforts.

The third volume of the Chloe Chronicles, titled Vengeance Chronicles, features Chloe teaming up with the "Angel of Vengeance" Andrea Rojas (Denise Quiñones), from season five's "Vengeance", to stop Lex Luthor. Andrea informs Chloe that Lex turned Lionel's "Level 3" facility into his own "33.1" research lab. Rojas, working with meteor infected individuals Yang and Molly Griggs, wants Chloe's help to expose LuthorCorp's experimentation on the meteor infected.

=== Young-adult novels ===
Chloe's first appearance in literature was in the Aspect published Smallville: Strange Visitors. Here, Chloe is conned into believing that Dr. Donald Jacobi, a "faith healer" is interested in her research on the meteor rocks. She quickly realizes, after attending one of Jacobi's shows, that he is nothing more than a con artist, which causes her to devote her time to proving that so no one will fall victim to his schemes. In Smallville: Dragon, Chloe attempts to solve the murder of one of her teachers, Mr. Tait, which she and Clark believe to be the work of recently released convict Ray Dansk. While attending a party put on by Lex, Chloe is injured during an attack on the crowd by Dansk, who has turned into a reptilian creature thanks to exposure to the meteor rocks.

=== Comic books ===
==== Smallville ====
In 2012, the Smallville series was continued through the comic book medium with Smallville: Season 11. Written by Bryan Q. Miller, who also wrote for the television series, the first issue reveals that Chloe and Oliver Queen are living in Star City. Chloe is working for the Star City Gazette, but remains a friend and ally to the heroes. She and Lois discover a spacecraft in Earth's atmosphere, later revealing the pilot is Chloe's counterpart from a parallel Earth (the same universe where Clark Luthor and alternate-Lionel Luthor were from). She was sent by her cousin, Lois Queen (the alternate version of Lois Lane and Clark's ally of that world), to warn Clark of the coming "Crisis", which destroyed her world. She dies after Oliver and Chloe take her to a hospital. After Chloe asks Lois to steal the components and plans of Lionel Luthor's memory device, Project Intercept, with Oliver, Chloe had Emil Hamilton build it with upgrades so she can find information from the remnants of her deceased counterpart's memories. Inside what is left of her counterpart's mind, Chloe finds a universe coming to an end, caused by an attack led by a powerful gargantuan being; she also witnesses Lois Queen's death. She finds she now has some of the memories of her counterpart, and discovers her killer is one of the Multiverse's guardians, the Monitors. After taking a leave of absence with Oliver, Chloe later return as Clark begins to gather everyone to make a stand against The Monitors. At this point, Chloe is now about nine months pregnant. After the Monitors' defeat, Chloe and Oliver join the Department of Extranormal Operations. She later gives birth to a baby boy, whom she and Oliver named "Jonathan", after Clark's late-adoptive father Jonathan Kent.

==== Other versions ====
Although Chloe appeared alongside her television cohorts in the Smallville comic books, which featured tie-ins to the Chloe Chronicles webisodes, DC writers hoped to bring Chloe into DC continuity at least as early as 2007. The character ultimately made her first appearance in the mainstream DC Universe in 2010. According to writer Kurt Busiek, the problem of bringing Chloe into the mainstream comic book universe, and keeping her television background, was that she would have filled two roles: "the Girl from Back Home and the Reporter". Those roles were already filled by the adult comic book versions of Lana Lang and Lois Lane, so the plan was to give the character a new background. Busiek hoped to make Chloe the younger sister of someone Clark had gone to school with, who was a now interning at the Daily Planet. Busiek believed that this would make her different from Lana and Lois, but still familiar to readers who also watched the show. Another distinguishing feature would be that this version of Chloe would not know Clark's secret, nor would she be meteor infected. These ideas never came to fruition.

Chloe first appeared in "Jimmy Olsen's Big Week", a serialized Jimmy Olsen story written by Nick Spencer, beginning in Action Comics #893 (November 2010). Spencer stated that introducing Chloe has been his first "positive contribution" to the DC Universe. Because of the continuity differences between Smallville and the comic book Superman stories, Spencer chose to stay "as true to the character" as he could by honoring her romantic history with Jimmy Olsen from later Smallville seasons, as well as her journalistic background from its early seasons. Spencer decided to introduce Chloe after he began conceiving of a clever, dogged female reporter for Jimmy Olsen to interact with, and realized that he had been subconsciously writing about Chloe.

Chloe Sullivan is mentioned during a flashback in a season three episode of Supergirl, titled "Midvale", where she helps a teenage Alex and Kara Danvers in solving a murder mystery of a classmate through email correspondence. Parallel to the original interpretation, she is referred to as Clark Kent's best friend and knows his secrets and even has a "Wall of Weird". This episode marked DC Entertainment's final use of the character before Allison Mack's exposure and conviction.
