= Lex Luthor (Smallville) =

Fictional character from Smallville

- Smallville character
- Michael Rosenbaum as Lex Luthor
- First appearance: "Pilot"; Smallville; October 16, 2001
- Last appearance: "Finale"; Smallville; May 13, 2011
- Based on: Lex Luthor by: Jerry Siegel; Joe Shuster
- Adapted by: Alfred Gough; Miles Millar
- Portrayed by: Michael Rosenbaum; Lucas Grabeel (teenager; "Reunion"); Kevin Miller ("Bride"/"Requiem"); Ayron Howey ("Echo"); Mackenzie Gray (clone; "Lazarus")
- Voiced by: Matt Adler ("Requiem")

In-universe information
- Full name: Alexander Luthor
- Affiliation: LuthorCorp
- Spouses: Helen Bryce (divorced); Lana Lang (divorced)
- Relatives: Lionel Luthor (father, deceased); Lillian Luthor (mother, deceased); Julian Luthor (brother, deceased); Lucas Luthor (half-brother); Tess Mercer (half-sister, deceased); Conner Kent (partial genetic clone)

Alexander Luthor is a character in the television series Smallville, portrayed by Michael Rosenbaum. Based on the DC Comics character of the same name, Lex was adapted to television in 2001 by Alfred Gough and Miles Millar - this is only the third time the character has been adapted to a live-action television series. The character has also appeared in various literature based on the Smallville television series, none of which directly continues from or into the television episodes. Rosenbaum played the character as a series regular from the pilot episode until the seventh season finale, but returned as a guest star for the two-hour series finale. Lucas Grabeel portrayed Lex as a teenager in the sixth season episode "Reunion". Following Rosenbaum's departure, Lex was played by stand-in actors in seasons eight and nine: Kevin Miller portrayed the character in the season eight episodes "Bride" and "Requiem", the latter where he was voiced by Matt Adler, while Ayron Howey appears as an hallucination of Lex in the season nine episode "Echo". Mackenzie Gray also portrayed a clone of Lex, known as "LX-13", in the season ten premiere "Lazarus".

In the series, Lex is sent to Smallville by his father Lionel Luthor to run the local LuthorCorp fertilizer plant. After driving his car off a bridge, he is saved by Clark Kent and quickly develops a new friendship with him. As the series unfolds, Lex's curiosity about Clark and all things connected to Clark ultimately destroys their friendship. Lex's relationship with his father is tension-filled from the start of the series, and eventually comes to an end when Lex murders his father in an effort to discover Clark's secret.

The Smallville incarnation of the character is first introduced as a morally ambiguous character, who walks a fine line between good and evil. Lex is an inquisitive person, and it is that curiosity that drives him to attain as much power as possible as the series progresses—it will ultimately lead him to being Clark's greatest enemy. Rosenbaum has been nominated for and won a Saturn Award and a Teen Choice Award for his portrayal of Lex on Smallville.

== Role in Smallville ==
Lex Luthor, introduced in the pilot as the son of billionaire Lionel Luthor (John Glover), is sent to Smallville by his father to run the local fertilizer plant. As a child, he is caught in the first meteor shower that renders him completely bald as well as providing him with perfect health. Years later as a young adult, Lex first meets Clark Kent (Tom Welling) saving his life from drowning and the two quickly become friends. During the early seasons of the show, Lex's friendship with Clark inspires him to try to be a better person than his father, but his motives are usually driven by curiosity for the unexplained, like the day Clark rescued him from drowning. Over the course of seven seasons—beginning in the pilot episode on the day Clark rescued him from drowning—Lex has been trying to uncover the secrets that Clark and the town of Smallville keeps.

In season one, Lex helps Clark try to get together with Lana Lang (Kristin Kreuk) while also trying to figure out the mystery behind his car crash. His friendship with Clark is seen as suspicious by Jonathan Kent (Jonathan Schneider) who would often refuse Lex's offers of financial aid despite knowing that Lex hadn't done any wrong. He hires Roger Nixon (Tom O'Brien), a reporter for the tabloid newspaper The Inquisitor, to discover how he survived the automobile accident where Clark saved him from drowning. All the evidence points to Clark having been hit by Lex's car, but Lex refuses to believe that's what happened so Nixon attempts to expose Clark to everyone. Around the same time, Lex also enlists the help of Dr. Hamilton (Joe Morton) to study the effects of the meteor rocks, finding an octagonal disc with unknown symbols imprinted on the disc's surface that match those on Clark's ship, while searching for traces of an alien ship that landed in Smallville in 1989. The disc is eventually stolen from Lex by Nixon in an attempt to open Clark's ship.

In season two, Lex's curiosity with the symbols continues. Lex first kills Nixon before the reporter can kill Jonathan for protecting Clark from Nixon. When Clark discovers the Kawatche Caves under a LuthorCorp construction site, Lex opts to be the curator of the caves to preserve them after he notices symbols on the cave walls that match the symbols on the disc, as well as an octagonal shape in the wall of the cave that would fit the disc perfectly. His interest grows more and more when he finds Clark constantly in the caves, and later with a piece of paper that appears to indicate that Clark has deciphered the language on the cave walls, but Clark denies being able to read the language. Lex's company eventually loses the Kawatche caves as Lionel has also developed an interest in the caves and the octagonal disc. During all this, Lex also met and courted Dr. Helen Bryce (Emmanuelle Vaugier) but Helen would try to kill him on their honeymoon.

Season three revealed why Lex endured Lionel's harsh parenting; his father blames him for his younger brother Julian Luthor's death but Lex took the blame to protect the true killer, his mentally unwell mother Lillian Luthor (Alisen Down), from Lionel's wrath. Also, Lex's curiosity into the symbols (and Clark) leads to a blowout between the two. When Lionel gives Clark a key to a room in the Luthor Mansion where Lex has been collecting information on Clark's family, Clark informs Lex that their friendship "is over".

In season four, Lex replaces his father as LuthorCorp's CEO and turns his attention turns toward finding three ancient stones, which contain the same symbols as those in the cave and on the disc. He fails to find all three stones but suspects that Clark did, and used the stones to find the treasure of knowledge they were supposed to have led to, often having confrontations with Jason Teague (Jensen Ackles). Around this time, Lex's lifestyle of bedding women and then leaving them the next day would catch up to him when one (Cobie Smulders) that he had previously slept with attempts to kill him after framing him for the murder of another one of the said women.

In season five, Lex becomes obsessed with uncovering Clark's secret; he breaks three metahuman criminals out of Belle Reve and sends them to the Kent Farm, where they hold several people close to Clark hostage. The scheme amounts to nothing, however, and Clark cuts Lex out of his life completely upon finding out. His curiosity into the symbols, which he believes to be alien in nature, results in Brainiac (James Marsters) arranging him to be possessed by the spirit of the Kryptonian criminal Zod. In season six, Lex married Lana after deceiving Lana into being pregnant with his child. Upon learning the truth, Lana faked her own death and attempted to pin the murder on Lex.

Season seven displayed Lex's descent into darkness; he has a brother-like relationship with Grant Gabriel (Michael Cassidy), the new editor of the Daily Planet who is actually a clone of Lex's late brother. Lex buys the Daily Planet to which Grant attempts to keep Lex from being controlling, thus Lex has his brother's clone murdered and staged as a failed mugging. Lex then discovers that the previous symbols are connected to the secret organization Veritas, which his father is a part of; the Veritas members learned that an alien visitor known as "The Traveler" would arrive in Smallville during the meteor shower of 1989. At this time, Lex realizes that Lionel has been covering up the Traveler's existence and subsequently kills his own father for it. He eventually discovers that the Veritas members knew of a means to control the Traveler, so Lex sets out to find the device. The device, an orb he finds in the mantle above a fireplace in the Luthor mansion, leads Lex to the Arctic where he ice burned his right hand, before entering the Fortress of Solitude, where he is confronted by Clark. Having finally discovered Clark's secret, Lex uses the orb to bring down the Fortress around Clark and himself.

In season eight, Lex is missing and Tess Mercer (Cassidy Freeman) is put in charge as Lex's hand-picked successor. Tess wants Lex found, until Lex is revealed to have a surgically implanted nano-transmitter in Tess's optic nerve. Wanting revenge, Lex uses a kryptonite bomb to have Lana's stolen bio-enhanced suit, designed to absorb and emit kryptonite radiation, absorb the radiation to de-activate the bomb and subsequently never be able to go near Clark again without fatal effects. Oliver Queen (Justin Hartley) discovers Lex's location and uses a bomb to blow up Lex's travelling medical transport, seemingly killing him.

Season ten revealed that at some point prior, Lex manufactured a number of clones, but the majority of them are flawed and age at an accelerated rate. One clone of Lex (Mackenzie Gray), aged approximately twenty years older than the original, attempted to get revenge on Clark by trying to kill Lois Lane (Erica Durance) but died before he could finish. The two-hour series finale revealed Lex had a composite clone created from the best pieces of several others. Lacking a heart, the clone was kept on life support. An alternate reality version of his father sacrifices himself to Darkseid, receiving Lionel's heart and effectively resurrecting Lex. He speaks with Clark, telling his former friend he accepts they have a destiny as enemies, but neither of them can fulfill their roles unless Clark defeats Darkseid by inspiring humanity. Lex later meets with Tess and fatally stabs his sister, but Tess poisons him with a specialized neurotoxin that removes all of Lex's memories. The series ends by shifting seven years into the future, where Lex has become the President of the United States.

== Portrayal ==
When crafting Smallville's version of Lex Luthor, series developers Alfred Gough and Miles Millar decided that he would not be a precursor to the more comedic role performed by Gene Hackman in the Superman film series; the pair wanted him to be likeable and vulnerable. The role was difficult to cast, as no one involved in the casting could agree on who they liked for the role. Gough and Millar wanted to cast a comedian for the series, on the belief that comedians always want to "please and be loved at the same time". Michael Rosenbaum auditioned for Lex Luthor twice. Feeling he did not take his first audition seriously, Rosenbaum outlined a two-and-a-half-page scene, indicating all the places to be funny, charismatic, or menacing. His audition went so well that everyone agreed he was "the guy".

Before Rosenbaum got the part, Martin Cummins auditioned for the role of Lex Luthor; Cummins would go on to play Dr. Garner, a neuro-scientist who experiments on Clark Kent, in multiple episodes of Smallville spanning season two and three. Zachary Levi, who originally auditioned to play Clark Kent, was asked to audition for Lex Luthor and impressed several of the show's creatives. Levi believed so strongly that he was going to be cast that he moved to Vancouver and shaved his head before being told by the network that he was not chosen. Michael Rosenbaum is not the only actor to portray Lex on the show. There have been four other actors that have performed the role; Matthew Munn, Wayne Dalgish, Lucas Grabeel, and Connor Stanhope have all portrayed Lex Luthor as a child in various episodes throughout the series. Rosenbaum relished the opportunities he gets to show Lex's evil side, even if it is only for a few seconds in earlier seasons. Specifically, he delighted in the chance to "go overboard", like he did in "Hug" where his character pulls out a machine gun and shoots everything in sight; to the actor, this gave the audience a glimpse into who Lex was becoming. To portray Lex's signature bald head, Rosenbaum had to go through more than just a regular head shaving. Not only was his head shaved every day, but he had to undergo hours of make-up treatments on his head, in various color combinations, so that his natural hairline was not visible on film. After seven seasons of portraying Lex Luthor on Smallville, Rosenbaum departed from the show, having decided to move on with his acting career. In 2011, Rosenbaum agreed to appear in the series finale and expressed that his return for the final episode was for the fans.

== Character development ==
=== Storyline progression ===
Rosenbaum believed that Lex was trying to be a hero in season one, but that his character showed signs of having to fight "ambiguity" and stay on the straight path. The tension-filled relationship with his father, which is first established in the pilot episode, comes to a crossing in the season one finale, when Lex is left with the decision to either help his father remove the structural beam that has fallen on him, or let him die. Rosenbaum wanted the audience to see that Lex was really contemplating what his life would be like if Lionel was no longer around. As Rosenbaum explained the scene:

I think the thing that separates a murderer from a regular person who's sane is that one moment of decision. Murderers can make the decision to commit that act and kill, which most people probably never have to face. You or I have never been pushed that far, and in comparison to Lex's life, our lives haven't been that traumatic. For that moment in the library, Lex forgot who he was. That's the way I played it, and that's the way I wanted it to come across. And it's those decisions that you make that make you realize that there's such a fine line between rational and irrational. When you're driving down the road, your day's just gone to hell, and you're really upset for a moment you just want to jerk the wheel off the road. Most people just think that for a second then let it go, but at the moment when you think it, are you really contemplating it? Would you really do that? Most people wouldn't, but when he sees his father lying there, it's one of those moments where Lex is like that driver.

Season two delved deeper into Lex's darker moments, from the time he wavers to save his father's life, to his outburst at Jonathan for what he feels is unfair treatment. These moments play into Lex's psyche. Season three's "Memoria" finally explained the mysterious circumstances surrounding the death of Lex's infant brother, Julian. Gough explains that they had known the story of Julian Luthor back in season one, when the character was first mentioned in "Stray", but they wanted to find the right time to explain the situation. The creative team wanted the audience to think that Lex was responsible for Julian's death as an infant, before finally revealing that Lex was merely covering for his mother.

Season four began expanding on the series long story arc of Lex's feelings for Lana. Though the seeds were planted in the second episode of the first season, it was not until season four that Lex began to show more of his true feelings. According to Gough, not only was Lex trying to protect Lana from Jason Teague (Jensen Ackles), Lana's boyfriend who was also after the stones of knowledge, but he was also trying to get Jason out of the picture completely so he could have Lana for himself. Writer Darren Swimmer questioned Lex's motives from earlier seasons: "You have to ask yourself, in the words of Lex Luthor himself: Why would some billionaire want to be bailing out this girl and buying her a coffee house to begin with? What's that all about?" Writer Todd Slavkin described season five as "the darkening of Lex Luthor". By the time "Aqua" came around, Lex had removed the gloves, as there is no friendship with Clark that he needed to worry about, and his dark side began to show its face. Season five also saw Lex's hunger for power begin to develop, as he campaigned for a Kansas senate seat. It was the events of "Lexmas" that drove Lex to continue his pursuit of ultimate power. In "Lexmas", Lex is shot and he gets a chance to live a life where he is married to Lana and he is no longer on a quest for power. In this alternate reality, without all the power and money that he had originally had, Lex is unable to save Lana, who dies after giving birth to their second child. It is here that Lex decided that he would always "go for the prize".

=== Characterization ===
One of Lex's key characteristics is his curiosity for the unexplained. Lex's primary motive for his "shady" actions derives from his curiosity, specifically beginning from the moment he and Clark meet after Lex hits Clark with his Porsche. Clark always appearing when something strange happens in Smallville does nothing but fuel Lex's curiosity. Rosenbaum believes that Lex only sees two options: "For Lex, it's either take a nice ride to Metropolis and work with his dad, or find out what's going on with this strong, strange fellow, Clark Kent". Another characteristic of Smallville's Lex Luthor—one that is being developed over the course of the series—is his evilness. Rosenbaum believes that what the audience sees in Lex's dark side in the early seasons is merely a taste of what the character is truly capable of. In the season two premiere "Vortex", Rosenbaum requested Greg Beeman to film a close-up of him after he shoots Nixon, in an effort to open a window into Lex's darker side. Rosenbaum intended to leave the interpretation of whether Lex enjoyed killing Nixon open to the audience. As Beeman explains Lex Luthor's thoughts after killing a man for the first time, even if it was in self-defense,"... either Lex is horrified and appalled, or he liked it, and it felt good to him". According to Rosenbaum, when Lex reaches that point where he uses all of his mind, and "really flips out", that is the point where the "world needs to hide". Television reviewer Brian Byun felt that it was this struggle between good and evil inside Lex that not only made him an anti-hero, but also, given that the audience familiar with Lex's mythology and the knowledge that he will end up becoming Superman's greatest enemy, make Smallville's Lex Luthor a "tragic figure [of] almost Shakespearean grandeur".

Taking a page out of Chazz Palminteri's A Bronx Tale, Rosenbaum ignored the script during his final scene with Kristin Kreuk for the season six finale. Here, as Lana is informing Lex that she is going to leave, Lex walks around her and closes the door to her exit. Rosenbaum was trying to invoke a moment of fright for the audience. To the actor, he wanted the audience to wonder what Lex was going to do to Lana; it was a moment meant to show just how unpredictable Lex can be.

Lex: Do you think I'd look better with hair?

Lana: I don't know. I've never thought about it.

Lex: I've thought about it; I've thought about a lot of things. ... Clark has nice hair.

— Writer Steven DeKnight describes this exchange of dialogue, from season five's "Lockdown", as providing an insight into Lex's feelings of inadequacy and envy of Clark.

As the seasons progressed, and the character began to grow darker and more sinister, Rosenbaum sought more opportunities to bring humor to the scene, either with physical subtleties like little smiles at key moments, or "self-deprecating humor". One such instance, which became popular with audiences, was in the season six episode "Justice", where Lex made a joke about wanting a ponytail. The producers were concerned over the piece of dialogue, but Rosenbaum convinced them that he could pull it off. To Rosenbaum, this quip by Lex makes him more credible as a person, because it is well known that Lex always wanted hair. This moment reflects an earlier episode, where Lex reveals his feelings of meagerness when comparing himself to Clark. In season five's "Lockdown", Lex provides a window into his thoughts about his place in Smallville. As writer Steven S. DeKnight describes it, the audience gets to see a moment where Lex shows how he still feels like an outsider, and that he views Clark as this "perfect person". DeKnight believes that, from how Clark sees it, Lex is driven by his desire to attain everything that Clark has, like his family and girlfriend.

Lex also develops a craving for power, with that hunger expanding in season five. Al Gough believes that Lex's political motivations are based on his lust for power. Rosenbaum echoes that opinion, believing that Lex can never get enough; "Lex is an insatiable character". Rosenbaum believes that nothing will satisfy Lex's hunger, and that he will keep going until he is president of the United States. Even then, he will keep trying to make the majority of people like and believe in him.

Visually, the character of Lex Luthor has his own characteristics. In Smallville, Lex is usually given a "glass, steel [colored] background", and he is dressed in a lot of black, grey, and "cool tones" clothing like purples and blues.

=== Relationships ===
Rosenbaum realizes that the friendship between Lex and Clark is destined to fail, but that Clark's friendship truly is important to Lex early in the series. The actor also believes that if Clark could see the darkness that Lex is constantly fighting then he would understand more of Lex's actions. Reviewer Brian Byun expressed that the choice to explore the friendship between Clark and Lex, before they become sworn enemies, which was something that had been used in the past but never to the depth of what Smallville is doing, helped keep the show from becoming "Dawson's Creek with superpowers".

Like Lana, who held emptiness inside her after the loss of her parents, which she tried to fill with the men in her life, Lex attempts to fill his own void, over the loss of his mother, with the women in his life. According to writer Holly Harold, Lex "needs and wants to be loved". Rosenbaum agrees, and feels that Lex is searching for that "unconditional love". The actor likens this feeling to one that everyone can relate to, but that Lex fails to achieve with not only the women he develops relationships with, but also with his own father. Rosenbaum and Annette O'Toole (Martha Kent) agree that the only person that could give Lex that love is his mother, who died when he was a child. Whenever they have scenes together, O'Toole and Rosenbaum try and hint around the idea that Martha wants to provide that love for Lex, because she recognizes that he needs it, and that Lex really wants her to provide it as well.

After various failed relationships, Lex finally believes he has what he wants when he begins a romantic relationship with Lana Lang. In "Hypnotic", in an effort to stop hurting Lana emotionally, Clark told her that he no longer loved her. This drives Lana into Lex's arms. Writer Darren Swimmer explains that this was not something that just happened in the series, but something that had been hinted at for many seasons. Rosenbaum admits that Lex had a crush on Lana for many years, but contends that he tried to help Clark win Lana early on—he succeeded. When Clark and Lana's relationship crumbled, because of Clark's deceit, Lex was waiting. Rosenbaum believes that Lana was "tired of the boy and wanted a man around". By contrast, Swimmer believes that Lana started dating Lex as a way of making Clark mad, but the relationship "turned into much more". Kreuk contends that Lana went to Lex because "she knows she will never really love him". Kreuk believes that Lana's relationship with the men in her life was originally motivated by a desire to fill a void in her life that was left after her parents were killed. This need to fill that emptiness was fulfilled in "Void", when Lana took a drug to induce death so that she could see her parents in the afterlife. Upon meeting her parents, Kreuk believes that Lana realized that she no longer needed someone else to fill that hole in her. Kreuk sees this filled void as the reason why Lana would gravitate toward Lex. Kreuk feels that if Lex had chosen a different path after the events of "Lexmas", then Lana would have been able to truly love him.

As Rosenbaum describes it, Lex views Lana as this beautiful, charming girl with a little naïveté. It is this naïveté that allows Lex to believe that he can trust and confide in Lana, and that she is his one true love. Lex also knows that Lana will always love Clark, but he expects her to love him for who he is just the same. Rosenbaum does not believe that Lana gives that to Lex. Writer Holly Harold finds parallels between Lex's relationship with Lana, and that of Lionel's relationship with Martha. Both men believe that these two women will be their saving grace, and pull them back from the dark side. In Lex's defense, Rosenbaum contends that Lex is not using Lana in an effort to hurt Clark, but that he really does love her. The actor believes that Lex's problem lies in the fact that every time he has loved someone and opened up to them he has been hurt, or betrayed. Even though Lex loves Lana more than anyone else before her, he just cannot bring himself to open up completely for fear of repeating the past. Rosenbaum believes that the eventual dissolution of the marriage between Lex and Lana was a tragic moment in both characters' lives. It is a moment that solidifies Lex's history of opening up to women and having them hurt him.

It is not just the women in his life that Lex has a difficult time maintaining a healthy relationship with, but his father as well. Rosenbaum characterizes the relationship between Lex and Lionel as a form of tug-of-war, and disagrees with John Glover's assessment that Lionel is merely testing Lex for the life he is going to take over. For Rosenbaum, Lex is being pushed and pushed, and Lex is afraid that he will reach the point that he knows he will no longer be able to come back from. In "Vortex", Lex realizes that he forgot who he was in that moment that his father was trapped under the column, and he felt guilty over the situation. According to Rosenbaum, Lex realized that by letting his father die he would have been traveling down a dark path, and would have become all that his father was—evil. As Lex continues to live in his father's shadow, and as time progresses, he learns more about the "monster" that Lionel truly is. The breaking point comes when Lex learns that his father killed Lex's grandparents in a tenement fire. Rosenbaum sees this as the ultimate ethical dilemma—he likens it to parents learning that their child has murdered someone, and then having to decide if they should go to the authorities or not—and Lex, who can no longer take his father's abuse, decides to turn Lionel over to the FBI. According to Rosenbaum, the decision is justified to Lex, who sees that monster that Lionel really is from his actions—using electroshock therapy to erase Lex's memories, drugging Lex, killing his own parents, and the way he treated Lex's mother.

== Reception ==
Michael Rosenbaum was nominated multiple times for the Saturn Award category of Best Supporting Actor in a Television Series for his performance as Lex Luthor. His first nomination came in 2002, which is the only year he has won the award. The same year he was also nominator for Cinescape Genre Face of the Future Award, alongside co-star Kristin Kreuk. He followed that with consecutive nominations from 2003 to 2006. Rosenbaum was nominated for Choice Sidekick in the 2002 and 2003 Teen Choice Awards. In 2007, 2008, and 2009 he was nominated as a Teen Choice Awards Choice Villain.

== Other media appearances ==
=== Young adult novels ===
Lex makes his first appearance outside of the television series in the novel Smallville: Strange Visitors, published by Aspect. When a couple of con artists arrive in Smallville promoting miracle cures created by the meteor rocks, Lex becomes interested in what they are really after, as he believes their plans could hinder the research he is doing on the meteor rocks. After Jacobi and Wolfe's con is realized, Lex uses a dummy corporation to steal all of the meteor rocks Jacobi's Ascendence Foundation has collected. In Smallville: Dragon, Lex throws a party at his mansion for the local teenagers, that is ultimately crashed by a reptilian creature that was created by the meteor rocks. He is also visited by an old flame, Renata, who shows up looking to rekindle their relationship. Lex quickly discovers that she has an ulterior motive when she propositions him to fund a drug deal, which prompts Lex to realize that she was really sent by his father as some test for Lex.

=== Comic books ===
==== Smallville ====
In 2012, the Smallville series was continued through the comic book medium, with Smallville: Season 11. Written by Bryan Q. Miller, who also wrote for the television series, the first issue details Lex changing the LuthorCorp name to LexCorp, due to his memory loss in the series finale. Tess Mercer's death is ruled a suicide, and Lex sells the ownership rights to the Daily Planet. He also questions why he would befriend the "unsophisticated" farmer-turned-reporter Clark Kent, after reading some newspaper clippings, but occasionally he admits that he senses something about Clark that he cannot understand. He immediately harbors distrust with "Superman", after the latter reveals himself to the world. Lex does not know why he despises and obsesses with Superman other than trusting his feelings, suspecting it has something to do with his past. Thus, this reveals that there are remnants of memories left for Lex to continue his hatred towards the superhero but have no knowledge of Superman's secret identity, yet he remains a threat to Clark owing to the possibility of Lex remembering at any moment due to his subconscious is trying to warn him. Lex later discovers that he once knew who Superman is and determined to remember, realizing that Tess poisoned him was to protect The Blur. This leads to a proposal with General Sam Lane to create a joint venture between LexCorp and the Pentagon for the company's project, "Guardian Defense Platforms", which involves monitoring the world's metahuman and extraterrestrial communities. In the second issue, Lex takes steps to regain his lost memories, having his assistant Otis Berg research the neurotoxin Tess used on him, eventually he discovers that the toxin has caused Lex's brain to operate at a higher percentage than normal, increasing his overall intelligence. In addition, Otis discovers that the toxin not only erased Lex's memories and enhanced his intelligence, but also caused him to mentally bond with Tess's consciousness when she poisoned him. Clark and Oliver eventually discover what happened to Tess, and extracts her consciousness from Lex and uploaded it into the Watchtower's computer until they can clone her a new body, eventually a robotic one built by Emil Hamilton that mirrors her original's but it also gives her abilities include creating cyclone-force wind. It is also revealed that Lex was friends with Bruce Wayne, the secret identity of Batman, since childhood, but lost touch after the murder of Bruce's parents. Years later, Bruce is secretly aware that Lex is now corrupt. After he helps in defeating the Monitors, Lex considers running for the Oval Office; Lex knows that this was his goal to be the President of the United States before his amnesia.

==== Arrowverse ====
Michael Rosenbaum was approached by Warner Bros. and the Arrowverse television series' producers to reprise his role as Lex in the crossover "Crisis on Infinite Earths", but he declined, instead gaining a small mention as the President. His character, however, makes a cameo in the background of the comic book tie-in Crisis on Infinite Earths Giant along with other iterations of Lex Luthor including those from the other Superman-related media and adaptations such as the iteration based on the portrayal by Gene Hackman (with this Luthor remarking that the Earth-38 iteration reminds him of his nephew Lenny, a character from the film Superman IV: The Quest for Peace portrayed by Jon Cryer), due to it is centering on Cryer's Lex and Tyler Hoechlin's Superman from the television series Supergirl. It is revealed that Lex has formed "The Council of Luthors" with his parallel universe counterparts after contacting them during Smallville: Season Eleven, with him being identified as 167 after his Earth's designation, for schemes to eliminate Supermen from the multiverse so that they may conquer it without their enemies' interferences, and established an orbiting satellite base above Earth-99 (where its Superman was killed by Batman). The formation of the council has also led to the Supermen to form their own alliance to counter them, though it is not revealed of whether Clark had joined them prior to him giving up his powers for his family. Lex, like other members, despises the Luthor from Earth-38 (Cryer) and wants to kill him, especially after the Earth-38 variant proposes that they manipulate Supermen to fight the Anti-Monitor, despite the Earth-38 Luthor arguing that some of the Kryptonians likely would die fighting the interdimensional entity. As a member of the council, he now has his own Lexorian warsuit similar to the Earth-38's Luthor's, a kryptonite-powered exoskeleton provided by them for his fights against his own Superman.
