= Todd Slavkin and Darren Swimmer =

American screenwriting and producing duo

Todd Slavkin and Darren Swimmer are an American screenwriting and producing duo. They have generally worked in the genres of science fiction and fantasy. They have served as showrunners for the TV shows Smallville, Melrose Place, Shadowhunters and The Mysterious Benedict Society, and have also been involved in the shows No Ordinary Family, Alphas, Defiance, Dominion and Guilt. Slavkin has occasionally directed episodes of the TV series in which they are involved.

== Early life ==
Slavkin and Swimmer met when they were both students at Palms Junior High School in Los Angeles, California; they have been friends ever since.

== Career ==
The two wrote the screenplay for the 1994 TV movie Natural Selection, as well as the 2004 direct-to-video film Control.

From 2003 to 2009, they wrote 24 episodes of Smallville, and received story credit for another two episodes. Slavkin also directed two of the show's episodes. They also helped with the show's production, eventually serving as showrunners for Smallville in its eighth season, from 2008 to 2009, along with Kelly Souders and Brian Peterson, after the departure of original showrunners and series creators Alfred Gough and Miles Millar.

After Smallville's eighth season, the two left to develop and run the series Melrose Place, which lasted for one season from 2009 to 2010. They also wrote the series' pilot and final episodes.

They wrote three episodes of the 2010–2011 ABC science fiction series No Ordinary Family.

They served as consulting producers on the second season of the 2011–2012 Syfy series Alphas.

They served as first consulting producers, then executive producers, for the 2013–2015 Syfy series Defiance, and wrote six of the show's episodes. Slavkin directed one episode.

They served as executive producers for the 2014–2015 Syfy series Dominion, for which they also wrote one episode.

The served as executive producers, and wrote two episodes, of the 2016 British-American mystery series Guilt.

They served as showrunners of the Freeform supernatural drama series Shadowhunters for seasons two and three, replacing series creator Ed Decter, who left the show over creative differences. During that time, the two wrote four of the show's episodes, and Slavkin directed two episodes.

They served as showrunners for the 2021–2022 Disney+ mystery adventure series The Mysterious Benedict Society.
