= Bat boy (disambiguation) =

A bat boy is a person who carries bats for a baseball team.

Bat boy or batboy or variation, may also refer to:

- Bat Boy (character), a fictional creature who made many appearances in the defunct supermarket tabloid Weekly World News
- Bat Boy: The Musical, a musical based on the Bat Boy character
- Batboy, a nickname for a US Army airborne ranger assigned to the 75th Ranger Regiment originating from the period prior to the organization of the Ranger regiment in 1984 when there were only two independent Ranger Battalions
- Boy serving as a batman, particularly in the British army in colonial period India
- Batsboy, a boy batter (baseball)
- Batsboy, a boy batter (cricket)
- The Batboy (2010), a novel about a batboy, by Mike Lupica
- "Bat Boy and Rubin!" (Mad #8, Dec. 1953 – Jan. 1954), Kurtzman/Wallace Wood parody of Batman and Robin
- a boy vampire
- a male bat (Chiroptera)

== See also ==
- Batkid (Miles Scott, born 2008), cancer survivor and namesake of Batkid Day
- Boy (disambiguation)
- Bat (disambiguation)
- Batman (disambiguation)
- Batgirl (disambiguation)
- Batwoman (disambiguation)
- Batter (disambiguation)
