= List of Batman characters =

List of Batman characters or List of The Batman characters may refer to:

- List of Batman supporting characters – allies, sidekicks, and additional characters related to the character Batman
- List of Batman family enemies – adversaries of Batman and his supporting cast
- List of DC Comics characters named Batman – other superheroes who adopted the Batman identity
- List of Batman (TV series) characters – characters from the 1966–1968 Batman television series
- List of The Batman (TV series) characters – characters from the 2004–2008 animated series The Batman
- List of The Batman (film) characters – characters from the 2022 film The Batman
- List of Batman Beyond characters – characters from the 1999–2001 animated series Batman Beyond
- List of Batman: Arkham characters – characters from the Batman: Arkham video game series

== See also ==
- Batman (disambiguation) § Characters
- Batman (franchise) § Recurring cast and characters
- List of Batwoman characters – characters from the 2019–2022 Batwoman television series
- Batmen of All Nations – an international group of characters inspired by Batman
