= Bruce Wayne (disambiguation) =

Bruce Wayne is the secret identity of the DC Comics character Batman.

Bruce Wayne may also refer to:

== Fictional characters ==
- Bruce Wayne (1989 film series character), a character portrayed by Michael Keaton, Val Kilmer, and George Clooney from the 1989 film series
- Bruce Wayne (Dark Knight trilogy), a character portrayed by Christian Bale from The Dark Knight Trilogy
- Bruce Wayne (Gotham), the fictional character from the TV series Gotham
- Bruce Wayne Junior, a DC Comics alternate universe version of Robin
- Bruce Wayne (DC Extended Universe), a character portrayed by Ben Affleck from the DC Extended Universe

== Other uses ==
- Bruce Wayne (TV series), a cancelled 1999 series about DC Comics' young Bruce Wayne
- "Bruce Wayne" (Titans episode), a 2019 episode of the DC Comics TV series Titans
- "Bruce Wayne" (song), a rap song by Takeoff
- "Bruce Wayne", a song by Peso Pluma from Éxodo, 2024
- Bruce Wayne: Gothom City 1987, an album by Esham

== See also ==
- Bruse Wane, Jamaican-American rapper
- Bruce Wayne: Murderer?, 2001 DC Comics comic arc storyline; see List of Batman comics
  - Bruce Wayne: Fugitive, 2002 DC Comics comic arc storyline
- Bruce Wayne: The Road Home, 2010 DC Comics arc storyline
- Bruce Wayne Agent of S.H.I.E.L.D., 1996 Amalgam Comics comic arc storyline
- DeWayne Bruce (born 1962), American professional wrestler
- Bruce (disambiguation)
- Wayne (disambiguation)
- Batman (disambiguation)
