= Batgirl (disambiguation) =

Batgirl is a DC Comics superheroine character, the alter-ego of several characters in the Batman fictional milieu.

Batgirl or bat girl or variation, may also refer to:

== Arts and entertainment ==
=== DC Comics ===
- Batgirl (film), a cancelled HBO Max film in the DCEU film franchise
- Batgirl, a DC Comics comic book title featuring the titular character Batgirl
- Batgirl: Year One, a 9-issue comic book miniseries from DC Comics featuring the titular superheroine
- "Bat-Girl!", issue 139 of Batman from 1961 in comics
- Bette Kane, the late-1950s/early-1960s Bat-Girl
- Barbara Gordon, the traditional DC Comics Batgirl alter-ego, starting in the late-1960s
- Cassandra Cain, the early-2000s Batgirl
- Stephanie Brown (character), the circa-2010 Batgirl

=== Television ===
- "Bat Girl", a 1998 TV episode of Freaky Stories
- "Bat Girl", a 2012 TV episode of The Worst Witch, see List of The Worst Witch (2017 TV series) episodes
- "Bat Girl", a 2021 episode of Big City Greens, see List of Big City Greens episodes

=== Other entertainment ===
- Bat Girl, a fictional character from the 1924 film London After Midnight (film)
- Bat Girl, a 1967 Hong Kong film
- "Bat Girl", a 2014 song by Yoon Jong-shin and Younha

== Sports ==
- Batgirl (baseball), a person who assists in management of equipment on a baseball field, typically delivering and getting bats
- bat-girl.com, a sports blog written by baseball commentator Anne Ursu
- Batsgirl, a girl batter (baseball)
- Batsgirl, a girl batter (cricket)

== Other uses ==
- A girl vampire
- A female bat (Chiroptera)
- A girl serving as a batman in the military

== See also ==
- Bat (disambiguation)
- Girl (disambiguation)
- Batwoman (disambiguation)
- Bat boy (disambiguation)
- Batman (disambiguation)
- Batter (disambiguation)
