= Smallville =

American superhero television series (2001–2011)

- Genre: Action adventure; Coming of age; Superhero; Science fiction; Teen drama
- Based on: Superman by: Jerry Siegel; Joe Shuster
- Developed by: Alfred Gough; Miles Millar
- Showrunners: Alfred Gough; Miles Millar; Todd Slavkin; Darren Swimmer; Kelly Souders; Brian Peterson
- Starring: Tom Welling; Kristin Kreuk; Michael Rosenbaum; Eric Johnson; Sam Jones III; Allison Mack; Annette O'Toole; John Schneider; John Glover; Jensen Ackles; Erica Durance; Aaron Ashmore; Laura Vandervoort; Cassidy Freeman; Sam Witwer; Justin Hartley; Callum Blue
- Theme music composer: Gregory Slay; Cinjun Tate; Shelby Tate; Jeffrey Cain; Cedric LeMoyne
- Opening theme: "Save Me" by Remy Zero
- Composers: Mark Snow (seasons 1–6); Louis Febre (seasons 7–10)
- Country of origin: United States
- Original language: English
- No. of seasons: 10
- No. of episodes: 217 (list of episodes)

Production
- Executive producers: David Nutter; Alfred Gough; Miles Millar; Michael Tollin; Brian Robbins; Joe Davola; Ken Horton; Greg Beeman; James Marshall; Todd Slavkin; Darren Swimmer; Kelly Souders; Brian Peterson; Tom Welling
- Production locations: British Columbia, Canada
- Cinematography: Glen Winter; Barry Donlevy; Attila Szalay; David Moxness; Gordon Verheul; Michael Wale; Gregory Middleton; Randal Platt
- Editors: Ron Spang; Andi Armaganian; Neil Felder; David Ekstrom; Debby Germino; Vikash Patel; Stephen Mark; Peter B. Ellis
- Running time: 40–60 minutes; 50 minutes ("Pilot"/"Commencement"); 84 minutes ("Absolute Justice"/"Finale")
- Production companies: Tollin/Robbins Productions; Millar Gough Ink; DC Entertainment; Warner Bros. Television

Original release
- Network: The WB
- Release: October 16, 2001 – May 11, 2006
- Network: The CW
- Release: September 28, 2006 – May 13, 2011

Related
- Aquaman

Smallville is an American superhero television series developed by writer-producers Alfred Gough and Miles Millar, based on the DC Comics character Superman created by Jerry Siegel and Joe Shuster. The series was produced by Millar/Gough Ink, Tollin/Robbins Productions, DC Entertainment, and Warner Bros. Television. It follows the coming-of-age adventures of teenage Clark Kent (Tom Welling) in his fictional hometown of Smallville, Kansas, before he formally becomes the Man of Steel. The first four seasons focus on the high school life of Clark and his friends, his complicated romance with neighbor girl Lana Lang (Kristin Kreuk), and his friendship with future nemesis Lex Luthor (Michael Rosenbaum). From season five onward, Smallville ventures into Clark's early adult years, eventually focusing on his career alongside Lois Lane (Erica Durance) at the Daily Planet and introducing other DC comic book superheroes and villains.

Before the production, Bruce Wayne, a drama series chronicling the young protagonist's journey toward Batman, was proposed first. Although that series failed to generate interest, it inspired the idea of a Superman origin story, which later became Smallville. Gotham later used that idea three years after Smallville's conclusion.

Series developers Gough and Millar pitched their "no tights, no flights" rule to the president of Warner Bros. Television, reducing the Man of Steel to the bare moral essentials and examining what led Clark Kent to become the iconic superhero. After seven seasons with the show, Gough and Millar departed with little explanation. Smallville was primarily filmed in and around Vancouver, British Columbia, with local businesses and buildings substituting for Smallville locations. Most of the music for the first six seasons was composed by Mark Snow, who incorporated elements of John Williams's musical score from the Superman film series. Louis Febre (who worked with Snow from the beginning) became the series' primary composer in season seven.

Initially broadcast by The WB, the show premiered on October 16, 2001. After its fifth season, the WB and UPN merged to form The CW, the series' later United States broadcaster until its tenth and final season ended on May 13, 2011. Smallville was generally positively received when it began. Former Superman star Christopher Reeve approved of the series, making two guest appearances before his death. The pilot episode set a ratings record for a WB debut, with 8.4 million viewers. Over ten seasons, the series averaged about 4.34 million viewers per episode, with season two the highest-rated at 6.3 million. By the end of its run, Smallville passed Stargate SG-1 as the longest-running North American science fiction series by episode count. Since its first season, the series has received accolades ranging from Emmys to Teen Choice Awards. Smallville spawned a series of young adult novels, a DC Comics bimonthly comic book, soundtracks, and series-related merchandise. All ten seasons are available on DVD in regions 1, 2, and 4. After the series finale in 2011, the story resumed in comic book form as Smallville Season 11, which ran from April 2012 to November 2014.

== Series overview ==
Season	Episodes	Originally released			Average viewership (in millions)
Season	Episodes	First released	Last released	Network	Average viewership (in millions)
1	21	October 16, 2001	May 21, 2002	The WB	6.41
2	23	September 24, 2002	May 20, 2003	The WB	7.77
3	22	October 1, 2003	May 19, 2004	The WB	5.64
4	22	September 22, 2004	May 18, 2005	The WB	5.02
5	22	September 29, 2005	May 11, 2006	The WB	5.32
6	22	September 28, 2006	May 17, 2007	The CW	4.52
7	20	September 27, 2007	May 15, 2008	The CW	4.15
8	22	September 18, 2008	May 14, 2009	The CW	3.88
9	21	September 25, 2009	May 14, 2010	The CW	2.38
10	22	September 24, 2010	May 13, 2011	The CW	2.54

The regular cast is introduced in the first season, with storylines involving a villain deriving power from kryptonite exposure. The one-episode villains were a plot device developed by Gough and Millar. Smallville's first season primarily dealt with Clark Kent's coming to terms with his alien origin and the revelation that his arrival on Earth was connected to the death of Lana Lang's parents.

After the first season the series had fewer villain-of-the-week episodes, focusing instead on individual-character story arcs and exploring Clark's origins. Major storylines include Clark's discovery of his Kryptonian heritage and Lex Luthor's escalating conflict with his father, Lionel. The disembodied voice of Clark's biological father, Jor-El, is introduced; he communicates to Clark through his spaceship, setting the stage for plots involving his role in fulfilling Clark's earthly destiny.

In a fourth-season arc Clark, instructed by Jor-El, searches for three Kryptonian stones which contain the knowledge of the universe and form his Fortress of Solitude. Clark battles Brainiac in his attempts to release the Kryptonian criminal General Zod, and must capture (or destroy) other escaped Phantom Zone criminals. His cousin Kara arrives, and Lex Luthor discovers Clark's secret.

The eighth season introduces Davis Bloome (Smallville's version of Doomsday), and Tess Mercer replaces the departing Lex Luthor. Justin Hartley becomes a series regular as Oliver Queen (Green Arrow) after being a recurring guest in season six.

In the ninth season Major Zod (Callum Blue) and other members of Zod's military group are revived (without their Kryptonian powers) by Tess Mercer, and their efforts to regain their powers are the season's central conflict.

The final season revolves around Clark's attempts to lose his doubts and fears and become the hero he is meant to be, while confronting his biggest challenges: the coming of Darkseid and the return of Lex Luthor.

== Cast ==
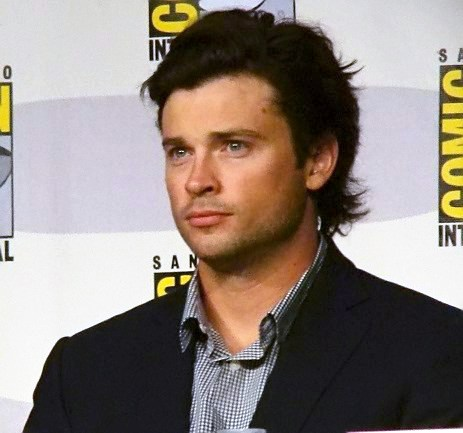
Although Welling initially refused to audition for the role of Clark Kent, he changed his mind after reading the script for the pilot episode.

- Tom Welling as Clark Kent, a young man with superhuman abilities who tries to find his place in life after discovering that he is an extraterrestrial in origin and uses his powers to help those in danger. Clark's season-one problems include his inability to share his secret and his desire for a normal life. After months of scouting, Welling was cast as Clark. David Nutter had to convince Welling's manager that the role would not hurt the actor's film career in order to get Welling to read the pilot script. After reading the script, Welling agreed to audition for the role of Clark Kent. Tom Welling operated under a strict "No Tights, No Flights" rule to stay true to the origin story element of the show.
- Kristin Kreuk as Lana Lang, the girl next door. Grieving the loss of her parents, she has empathy for everyone and feels connected to Clark. Kreuk was the first to be cast, after Nutter saw an audition tape the actress had sent. Although she left the series after the seventh season, she returned for five episodes in season eight as a special guest star.
- Michael Rosenbaum as Lex Luthor, a billionaire's son sent to Smallville to run the local fertilizer plant. After Clark saves his life, they become fast friends. As the series progresses, Lex's friendship with Clark crumbles until they consider themselves enemies. The role was difficult to cast; Rosenbaum auditioned twice and, feeling that he did not take his first audition seriously enough, outlined a two-and-a-half-page scene indicating where to be funny, charismatic or menacing. His second audition went so well that he was hired. Rosenbaum left the show after seven seasons, reprising his role for the series finale.
- Eric Johnson as Whitney Fordman, Lana's boyfriend in season one, who becomes mean to Clark and Lana's budding friendship and bullies him. He reconciles with Clark before joining the Marines and going to Indonesia. Although Whitney was written out of the show in the first-season finale, he made a special appearance in the season-two episode "Visage" (where it is disclosed that he was killed in action) and was also a guest star in the season-four episode "Façade" (during a flashback to Clark's freshman year of high school). Johnson, who auditioned for Lex and Clark before he was cast as Whitney, was pleased that the writers gave his character a hero's exit.
- Sam Jones III as Pete Ross, another best friend of Clark and the first person to whom Clark voluntarily tells his secret. Although he is in love with Chloe, he does not admit it because of the Clark-Lana-Chloe love triangle already in place. Ross was written out of the series at the end of season three, but made a guest appearance in season seven. Jones was the last of the series regulars to be cast, with Gough and Millar seeing him four days before they began filming the pilot. Jones is African-American while the comics have traditionally portrayed Ross as Caucasian.
- Allison Mack as Chloe Sullivan, one of Clark's best friends, who is in love with him (although her feelings are not reciprocated). Editor of the school newspaper, her journalistic curiosity and desire to "expose falsehoods" and "know the truth" create tension with her friends (especially when she investigates Clark's past). After learning about Smallville from casting director Dee Dee Bradley, Mack considered auditioning for Lana Lang but auditioned twice for Chloe Sullivan. The character was created just for the series and was intended to have an "ethnic background" before Mack was hired. She has since appeared in the mainline DC continuity.
- Annette O'Toole as Martha Kent, Clark's adoptive mother. She and her husband, Jonathan, give Clark advice about coping with his increasing abilities. In season five, Martha takes a state-senate seat, and in season six she leaves the show. Although Cynthia Ettinger was originally cast as Martha Kent, during filming everyone (including Ettinger) realized that she was not right for the part. O'Toole was committed to the television series The Huntress when Ettinger filmed the original pilot. Around the time the creators wanted to recast Martha Kent, The Huntress was coincidentally canceled, allowing O'Toole to join the cast. O'Toole previously portrayed Lana Lang in the film Superman III.
- John Schneider as Jonathan Kent, Clark's adoptive father, who goes to great lengths to protect his son's secret; according to Schneider, Jonathan is "perfectly willing to go to jail, or worse, to protect his son". Schneider was written out of the show in the series' 100th episode, with Jonathan dying of a heart attack on the night of his election victory. Millar and Gough wanted a recognizable face for Smallville; they were happy to cast Schneider as Jonathan because he was known for his role as Bo Duke from The Dukes of Hazzard, which Gough saw as adding to the belief that Schneider could have grown up running a farm.
- John Glover as Lionel Luthor, Lex's father. Lionel is responsible for the Kents' adoption of Clark without legal ramifications or questions about his origins. Glover tried to make Lionel seem to try to "toughen [Lex] up", and saw the character as a rich, powerful businessman who was disappointed in his son. Lionel was created for Smallville to parallel the Kents and as an "experiment in extreme parenting". A recurring first-season guest, Glover became a series regular from seasons two to seven until Lionel was murdered by Lex near the end of the seventh season. Lionel returns in a parallel-universe version, also portrayed by Glover, during the final season as a special guest star.
- Jensen Ackles as Jason Teague, Lana's love interest, in season four. He follows Lana to Smallville from Paris, taking a job as the school's assistant football coach, but is fired when their relationship comes to light. By the end of the season, it is disclosed that he was working with his mother to track the three Kryptonian stones of knowledge. Before he was cast as Jason, Ackles was second in line for the role of Clark Kent. Although Ackles received top billing for season four and was contracted for season five, he was written out of the show in the season four finale because of his commitment to Supernatural.

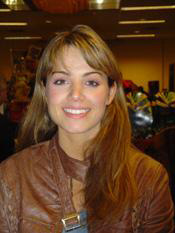
Erica Durance was cast as Lois Lane days before fourth-season filming began, and her appearance was initially restricted by the film division of Warner Bros. Studios.

- Erica Durance as Lois Lane, Chloe's cousin who comes to Smallville to investigate Chloe's supposed death and stays with the Kents. Durance, a recurring guest in season four, became a series regular. The producers wanted to bring Lois Lane to the series, and Chloe's supposed death in the season-three finale provided the opportunity. Durance was cast three days before filming began; although she could initially appear in only four episodes, according to the film division of Warner Bros., after negotiations her character was cleared for more appearances.
- Aaron Ashmore as Jimmy Olsen, Chloe's photographer boyfriend who works at the Daily Planet. Ashmore, a recurring guest in season six, became a regular cast member in season seven. He called his casting a welcome surprise: "I auditioned for [the role] and I put myself on tape. I hadn't heard anything, and a couple of weeks later, all of the sudden (sic), I got the call saying, 'You're going to Vancouver to start shooting Smallville'. It's a dream come true, really". After three seasons on the series (two as a regular), Ashmore's character was killed off by Davis Bloome out of jealousy for his relationship with Chloe. Although Ashmore's Jimmy Olsen was murdered, he said his character was not the "real" Jimmy Olsen, his real name revealed to be Henry James Olsen. Jimmy's younger brother, who appears briefly in the season-eight finale, is intended to be the Jimmy who works with Clark and Lois. Ashmore returns as the younger Jimmy in the series finale.
- Laura Vandervoort as Kara Zor-El, Clark's Kryptonian cousin. Sent to look after Kal-El (Clark), she was in suspended animation for eighteen years. When the dam confining Kara's ship broke in the season-six finale, "Phantom", she was set free. She has Clark's abilities, including flight. At the end of the seventh season, Kara was trapped in the Phantom Zone. Although Vandervoort did not return regularly for the eighth season, she returned to wrap up her storylines as a guest in season eight's "Bloodline" and as a special guest star in season ten's "Supergirl" and "Prophecy".
- Cassidy Freeman as Tess Mercer, Lex's handpicked successor as LuthorCorp CEO in season eight. Her name is an homage to two Superman characters, Eve Teschmacher and Mercy Graves. Freeman described her character as "fierce", "fun", and "intelligent", with finding Lex her primary season-eight goal. Tess believes that Clark will be able to help her. In the season-ten episode "Abandoned", it is disclosed that her birth name is Lutessa Lena Luthor and she is Lionel's illegitimate daughter.
- Sam Witwer as Davis Bloome, a "charismatic" paramedic struggling with inner darkness. Davis Bloome is Smallville's version of Doomsday (the only character to kill Superman). Davis would come to resemble his comic book counterpart over the course of the season. Brian Peterson said that with Michael Rosenbaum's departure, the new executive producers were looking for a villain "as great as Lex" and Doomsday fit the bill.
- Justin Hartley as Oliver Queen, the CEO of Queen Industries and leader of a small group of superheroes known as the Justice League. Hartley, a recurring guest in the sixth and seventh seasons, became a series regular in season eight and was the producers' first choice to play Queen. He was designed to shake up Clark and Lois in season six and to give Clark an alternate view of how to fight crime.
- Callum Blue as Zod, a Kryptonian criminal who was imprisoned in the Phantom Zone. His character is first mentioned in season five, when Brainiac uses Lex's body as a vessel for Zod's spirit, and he appears in a Kryptonian sphere in the season-eight finale. Smallville's executive producers called this incarnation "Major Zod" (as opposed to the typical "General Zod"), and in season nine "the venomous side of Zod rises because he experiences a few key betrayals with our beloved characters".

== Production ==
=== Development ===
Tollin/Robbins Productions originally sought to produce a series about a young Bruce Wayne, but Warner Bros. Pictures decided to develop an origin story film for Batman and did not want to compete with a television series. In 2000, Tollin/Robbins approached Peter Roth, president of Warner Bros. Television, about developing a series on a young Superman. That year, Alfred Gough and Miles Millar developed a pilot based on the film Eraser. After watching the pilot, Roth approached Gough and Millar about developing a pilot about a young Superman; the two made a "no tights, no flights" rule that Clark would not fly or wear the Superman suit during the series.

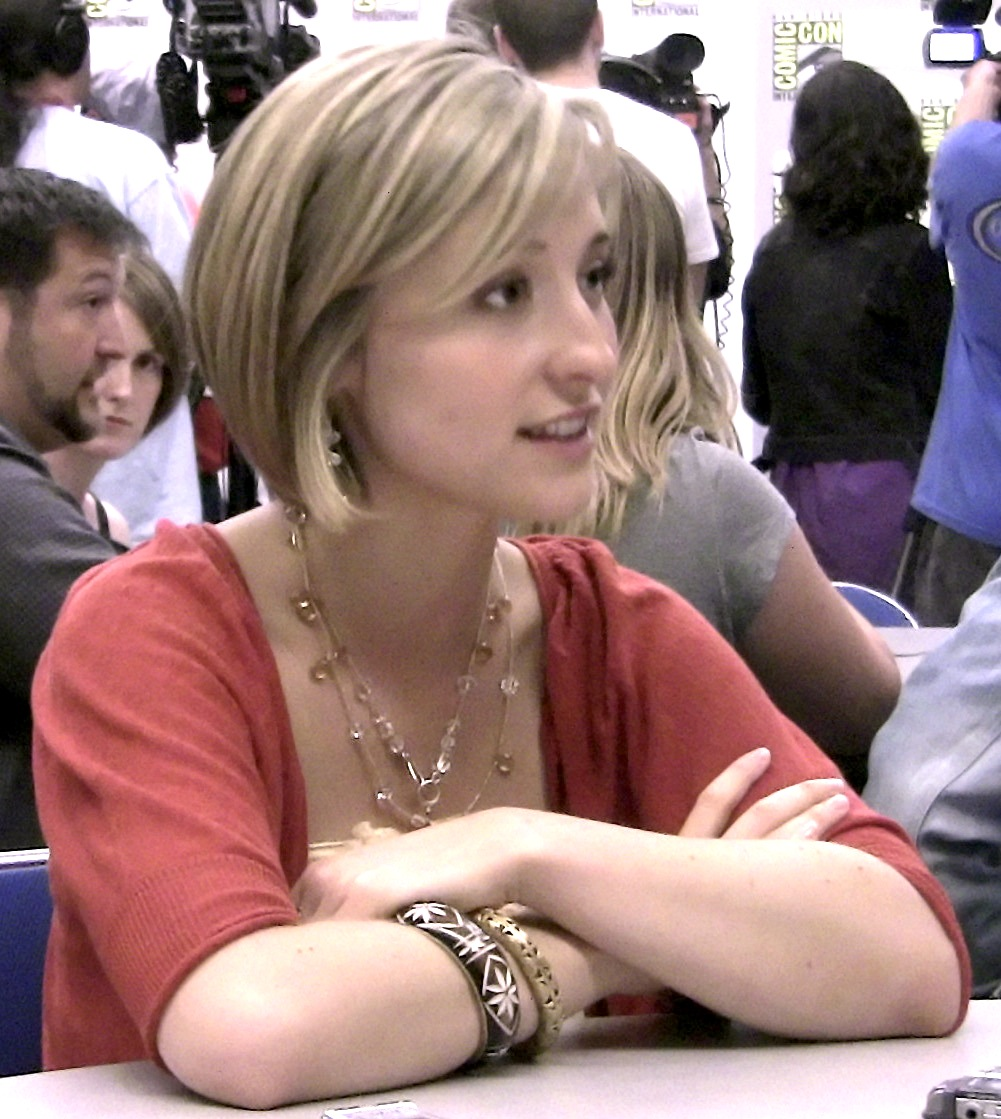
Chloe Sullivan (Allison Mack) was created for the series.

Gough and Millar wanted to strip Superman to his "bare essence", exploring why Clark Kent became the Man of Steel. They felt that because they were not comic book fans or familiar with the universe, they would have an unbiased approach to the series. Gough and Millar learned about the characters, researching the comics and choosing what they liked. They pitched their idea to the WB and Fox on the same day. A bidding war between the networks followed, with the WB committing to thirteen episodes.

Although Roth, Gough and Millar knew the show would be action-oriented, they wanted to reach 7th Heaven's "middle America iconography". To create atmosphere, the team decided the meteor shower bringing Clark to Earth would be the ironic foundation of the show. The primary source of his life on Earth and the super-powered beings Clark must fight, it would take away the parents of the girl he loves and start Lex Luthor down a dark path. Roth appreciated Clark's conflict in dealing with the fact that his arrival caused so much pain.

The creators also had to address why Lex Luthor would socialize with young people. They created a loneliness in the character which they felt would drive him to reach out to the teenagers, a loneliness echoed in Clark and Lana. Gough and Millar wanted a parallel to the Kents and created Lionel Luthor, Lex's father, whom they saw as conducting an "experiment in extreme parenting". They wanted a younger Kent couple, to be involved in Clark's life and help him on his journey. Chloe Sullivan (another character created for the series) was considered the "outsider" the show needed to ensure that someone would notice the strange happenings in Smallville rather than a "precursor to Lois Lane".

Smallville has been described by Warner Bros. as a from-the-roots reinterpretation of Superman mythology. Since the November 2004 reacquisition of Superboy by the Siegel family, a copyright infringement dispute has arisen over ownership of the fictional town of Smallville and a claimed similarity between Superboy and Smallville's Clark Kent. According to the Siegel heirs, "Smallville is part of the Superboy copyright" (which they hold).

=== Crew changes ===
In April 2008, after seven seasons with the series, Gough and Millar left Smallville. The developers thanked the cast and crew for their work, acknowledging that they never stopped fighting for what they saw as "their vision" of the show. The reason for their departure was not provided. Gough and Millar were replaced as showrunners by Todd Slavkin, Darren Swimmer, Kelly Souders and Brian Peterson. All began writing for the series at the start of the second season, and were executive producers by the seventh season. In 2009, after one season, Swimmer and Slavkin took over the new CW series Melrose Place and did not return for Smallville's ninth season; Souders and Peterson would continue as showrunners. Tom Welling became co-executive producer of the series that July. In March 2010, Millar, Gough and co-producer Tollin/Robins Productions filed a lawsuit against Warner Bros. and The CW charging that Hollywood's "vertical integration" cost Millar and Gough millions of dollars. The suit claimed that Warner Bros. failed to "maximize profits" in marketing Smallville, misrepresented production costs and sold the show to foreign markets at "well below the value of the series", not specifying the amount of compensation sought by the plaintiffs. The lawsuit ended with an undisclosed settlement in May 2013. Tom Welling was appointed an executive producer for Smallville's tenth season in May 2010.

=== Filming ===
The series was filmed at BB Studios in Burnaby, British Columbia. Although production was initially planned for Australia, Vancouver had more of a "Middle America landscape". The city provided a site for the Kent farm, doubled for Metropolis, provided a cheaper shooting location and was in the Los Angeles time zone. Smallville's Main Street is a combination of two locations in the towns of Merritt and Cloverdale.

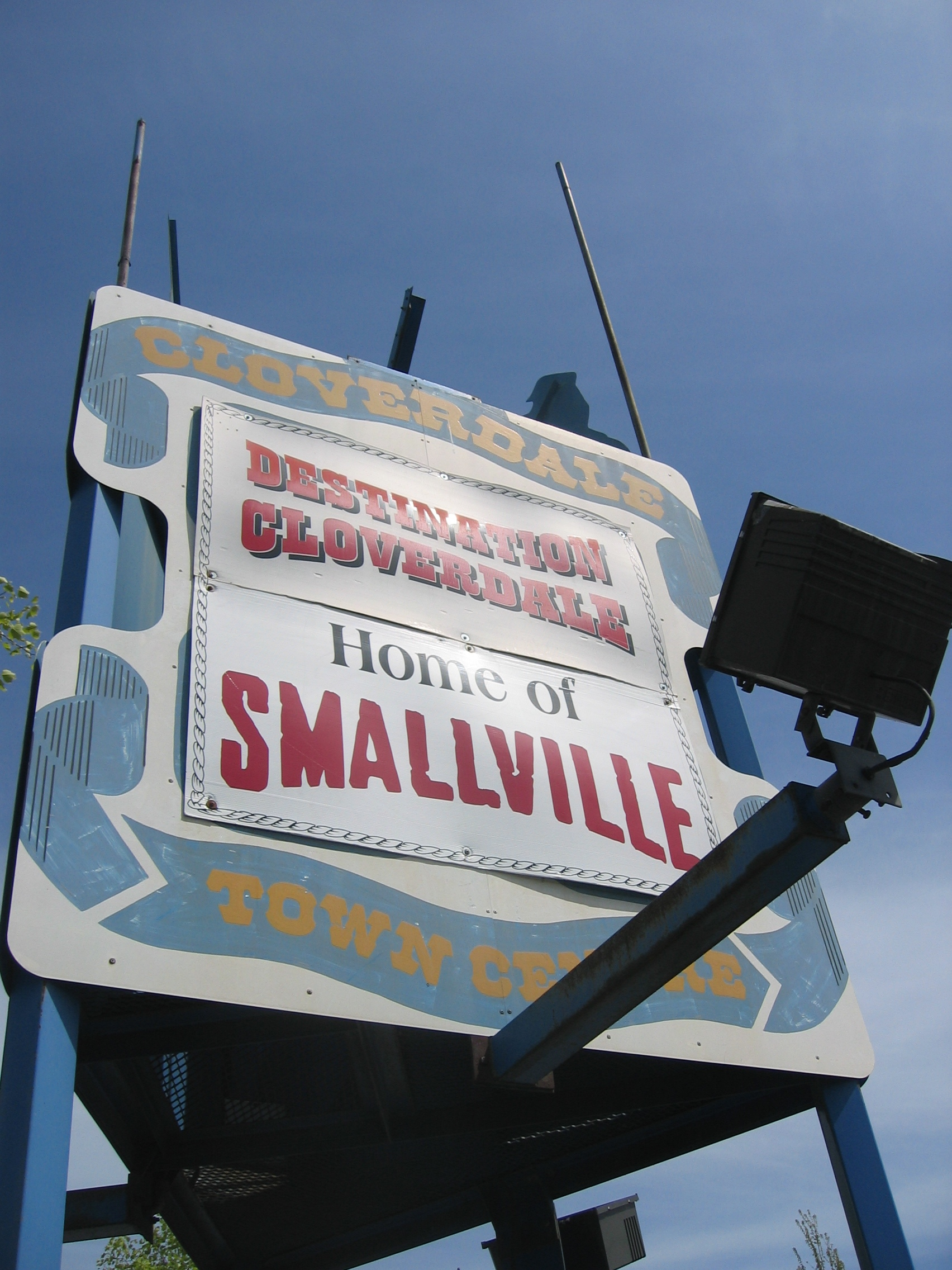
Cloverdale welcome sign

Vancouver Technical School doubled as the exterior for Smallville High, since the school had the "mid-American largesse" wanted by the filmmakers and was in keeping with Millar's idea that Smallville should be the epitome of "Smalltown, USA". Templeton Secondary School was used for Smallville High's interior. During season one, the production team repainted most of Templeton in Smallville High's red and yellow and distributed large Smallville High Crows logos; so much of the school was painted that it adopted red and yellow as its school colors. The students became accustomed to the film crew (which had to shoot when school was in session), and when a class was dismissed the crew stepped aside so the students could move the equipment to get to their lockers for the next class.

The Kent farm is a working farm in Aldergrove. Owned by the Anderlinis, the crew painted their home yellow for the show. Exterior shots of Luthor Mansion were filmed at Hatley Castle in Victoria. The interiors were filmed at Shannon Mews in Vancouver, also the set for the Dark Angel pilot and the film Along Came a Spider. Clova Cinema, in Cloverdale was used for exteriors of the Talon, Smallville's coffeehouse.

Reeve's guest appearances in the second and third seasons were filmed in New York City.

The story is told from Clark's point of view, so color schemes and camera selection illustrate how he interprets his environment. When he is safe at home, the colors are "warm and gentle" earth tones and the camera movement is "very gentle". When Clark is keeping his secret and not in danger, the lighting is more neutral and the camera more mobile. When danger is present, the lighting becomes colder and the camera is handheld to allow for more "extreme angles". In Metropolis "clean, hard-lined architecture" predominates, with blues, purples and reflective metals the dominant scheme. The same concept is used for the characters; Lex usually has a "glass, steel background", and Lionel has a white or "clinical blue" background. Lex typically wears black, grey and "cool tones" (purples and blues). Clark is represented by red, yellow and blue, similar to the traditional Superman costume, and "All-American" red, white and blue. From season two onward, Entity FX produced all of the visual effects for Smallville, including the view of the Metropolis skyline.

=== Music ===
Composer Mark Snow worked with producer Ken Horton to create Smallville's score. Snow composed music as he watched the picture, and tweaked his performance when he reviewed his initial recordings. He then sent the music to the producers, who sent it back for recomposition if needed. Individual episodes have their own soundtrack, comprising one (or more) songs. Jennifer Pyken and Madonna Wade-Reed of Daisy Music looked for songs for the soundtrack. Their choices were discussed by the producers, who decided which songs they wanted and secured their rights. Although Snow said it initially seemed odd to combine two types of music on a "typical action-adventure" television show, "the producers seem to like the contrast of the modern songs and the traditional, orchestral approach to the score".

I get a locked picture on a videotape which syncs up with all my gear in the studio. I write the music, finish it up, mix it up, send it through the airwaves on the internet, and the music editor puts it in. They call up usually and say, 'Thank you, well done'. Sometimes they call and say, "Thank you, not so well done—can you change this or that?" I say "Sure", make the changes and send it back.

— Mark Snow, on composing music for each episode.

The main Smallville theme was not composed by Snow, although he composed opening themes for other shows (including The X-Files). The series' opening theme is the short version of "Save Me" performed by Remy Zero. Snow composed the closing-credits music, which was intended as Smallville's theme. During the first two seasons, the closing-credits music was a potential theme for the series (before "Save Me" was selected); it was more "heroic" and "in-your-face". Snow was told during season two that the closing credits needed new music, since the show had evolved and the existing music was no longer suitable, and he created a new, toned-down score with a more "melodic" sound. Snow has also reworked music from the previous Superman films. John Williams's musical score for the Krypton sequence in the opening credits of Superman was used in season two's "Rosetta" (which featured a guest appearance by Christopher Reeve) and several times in the season-two finale. To save money Snow recorded his version of Williams's score, since using the original version would have required the team to pay Williams's orchestra.

Snow left Smallville following his work on the sixth season and moved on to other projects such as Ghost Whisperer. Reminiscing about his work on the show, Snow said that much of the music had not changed during the series and that it was "more [about] maintaining the heroic concept and the mythology than progressing through specific changes". Louis Febre, who worked closely with Snow from the beginning, became the sole composer for Smallville in season seven. Febre said that since he began composing for Smallville there was a shift to "thematic development" in the score, paralleling the characters' growth: "As Clark grew emotionally and intellectually more complex, I found a need to comment musically on his growth, and as he drew closer to his Superman persona, it became obvious that a 'Superman' theme would be required".

The creative team had a number of opportunities to try different music to enhance an episode's storyline. Pyken and Wade-Reed chose and coordinated music on the show when Snow and Febre's scores were not used. In season three's "Slumber", producer Ken Horton wondered if they could get a band to provide music for the entire episode. During a breakfast meeting with the music department of Warner Bros. R.E.M. was suggested, and Pyken and Wade-Reed immediately saw an opportunity to connect the episode's featured band with its story (which revolved around REM sleep). That season, Al Gough wanted to use Johnny Cash's cover of the Nine Inch Nails song "Hurt" for the final scene of "Shattered" (when Lionel Luthor looks at Lex through a one-way mirror at Belle Reve sanitarium) as soon as he read the episode's script. Cash died while Wade-Reed was trying to obtain the rights for the song and his heirs, believing that the song's use in the episode would honor his memory, gave Smallville the rights.

For season three's "Resurrection" and "Memoria", songs were chosen as symbolism for the characters. In "Resurrection", The Rapture's "Infatuation" was used during a scene with Lex and Lana to symbolize the question, "Are we ever going to figure out what these two people think of each other?" For "Memoria" Gough wanted to use Evanescence's "My Immortal" for the episode's final scene, telling Wade-Reed that he saw the song as being about mothers. In that scene Clark tells Martha that his first childhood memory was of his mother, Lara.

Season three's "Velocity" provided the music editors with the opportunity to use hip-hop, rarely used in the series. The episode, similar to The Fast and the Furious, focused on Pete. Wade-Reed heard of British hip-hop artist Dizzee Rascal, and was the first person in the United States to secure the rights to Rascal's album. Greg Beeman directed episodes, and sometimes scenes, with particular songs in mind. For "Vortex" in season two, he used Coldplay's "In My Place" for the final scene. In the season-two finale "Exodus", Beeman directed the scene where Lana shows up at the Kent barn before Lex's wedding to Matthew Good's "Weapon". The lyrics speak of an angel and devil "by my side", and Beeman timed specific shots to the song's lyrics.

== Broadcast ==
Smallville premiered at 9:00 pm on Tuesday, October 16, 2001 on the WB. For five seasons, the series aired on the WB, moving from Tuesday at 9:00 pm to Wednesday at 8:00 pm and eventually to Thursday at 8:00 pm. In 2006, before the start of Smallville's sixth season, the WB and UPN merged into The CW and the series continued in its lineup. During its seventh season, the series aired in Canada a day earlier than it did in the United States. In May 2009, Smallville's ninth season moved to Friday at 8:00 pm, considered the "death slot" for television programs. By the end of its tenth season it was the longest-running science-fiction TV show in the United States, breaking the record held by Stargate SG-1. Syndication rights became available in October 2004 when it began airing alongside Gilmore Girls on ABC Family (now Freeform) five nights a week. After the series concluded, TNT began airing episodes on October 3, 2011. Smallville began streaming on Hulu on October 1, 2016.

== Reception ==
Smallville set a WB record as its highest-rated series debut, with 8.4 million viewers tuned in for the pilot. Its premiere set a WB record for adults aged 18–34 and finished first among viewers aged 12–34, with Warner Bros. president Jordan Levin crediting the series with invigorating the network's Tuesday-night lineup. Smallville appeared on the cover of Entertainment Weekly as one of five new shows to watch. After its first season, the series was sixth on the Parents Television Council's 10-best list of broadcast programs. Levin, acknowledging early concerns that Smallville had become a villain of the week series, said that season two would introduce "smaller mini-arcs over three to four episodes" and become less of a "serialized show". According to Gough, although each succeeding season relied more on season-long story arcs, an occasional villain-of-the-week story was necessary. The villain-of-the-week stories were more harshly criticized by fans of the Superman mythology, but Gough wanted to please them and the WB's general audience (teenagers who preferred villain-of-the-week stories over episodes focusing on the Superman mythology).

Christopher Reeve, star of the Superman films, expressed his approval of the show:

I was a little bit skeptical when I heard about [Smallville] at first, but I must say the writing, the acting, and the special effects are quite remarkable. In 1977, a big stunt scene would have taken us a week to film—it's pretty impressive what they are able to do with computers and effects technology today on a weekly TV show. It gives it a lot more production value and inventiveness than I thought I was going to see when I first heard about the series. I think the show is doing a really good job following the mythology, and Tom is doing a good job following the tradition.

According to MTV's Karl Heitmueller, Smallville's Clark Kent was a better representation of the original material and remained "true to the heart of the story" by showing Clark's selflessness and his struggle between his desires and his obligations, but he also wrote that the series would have a difficult time addressing why no one in Smallville (including Lex Luthor) recognized Clark when he put on the suit. TV Guide's Michael Schneider called it one of the best examples of a superhero adaptation for television, but Christopher Hooton of Metro wrote that Smallville was a story which did not need to be told: "No-one bothered to follow Bruce Wayne's tedious years spent manufacturing microchips before he became Batman, so why must we endure a decade of flannel shirt-wearing Clark Kent bucking hay?"

=== Nielsen rankings ===
The following is a table for the seasonal rankings, based on average total estimated viewers per episode, of Smallville on the WB and The CW. "Rank" refers to how Smallville rated compared to the other television series which aired during primetime hours.

Viewership and ratings per season of Smallville
Season	Timeslot (ET)	Network	Episodes	First aired		Last aired		TV season	Viewership rank	Avg. viewers (millions)
Season	Timeslot (ET)	Network	Episodes	Date	Viewers (millions)	Date	Viewers (millions)	TV season	Viewership rank	Avg. viewers (millions)
1	Tuesday 9:00 pm	The WB	21	October 16, 2001	8.35	May 21, 2002	5.96	2001–02	115	5.90
2	Tuesday 9:00 pm	The WB	23	September 24, 2002	8.66	May 20, 2003	7.53	2002–03	113	6.30
3	Wednesday 8:00 pm	The WB	22	October 1, 2003	6.82	May 19, 2004	5.92	2003–04	141	4.96
4	Wednesday 8:00 pm	The WB	22	September 22, 2004	6.07	May 18, 2005	5.47	2004–05	124	4.40
5	Thursday 8:00 pm	The WB	22	September 29, 2005	5.90	May 11, 2006	4.85	2005–06	117	4.70
6	Thursday 8:00 pm	The CW	22	September 28, 2006	4.96	May 17, 2007	4.14	2006–07	125	4.10
7	Thursday 8:00 pm	The CW	20	September 27, 2007	5.18	May 15, 2008	3.85	2007–08	175	3.77
8	Thursday 8:00 pm	The CW	22	September 18, 2008	4.34	May 14, 2009	3.13	2008–09	152	3.74
9	Friday 8:00 pm	The CW	21	September 25, 2009	2.57	May 14, 2010	2.40	2009–10	129	2.38
10	Friday 8:00 pm	The CW	22	September 24, 2010	2.98	May 13, 2011	3.02	2010–11	202	3.19

=== Accolades ===
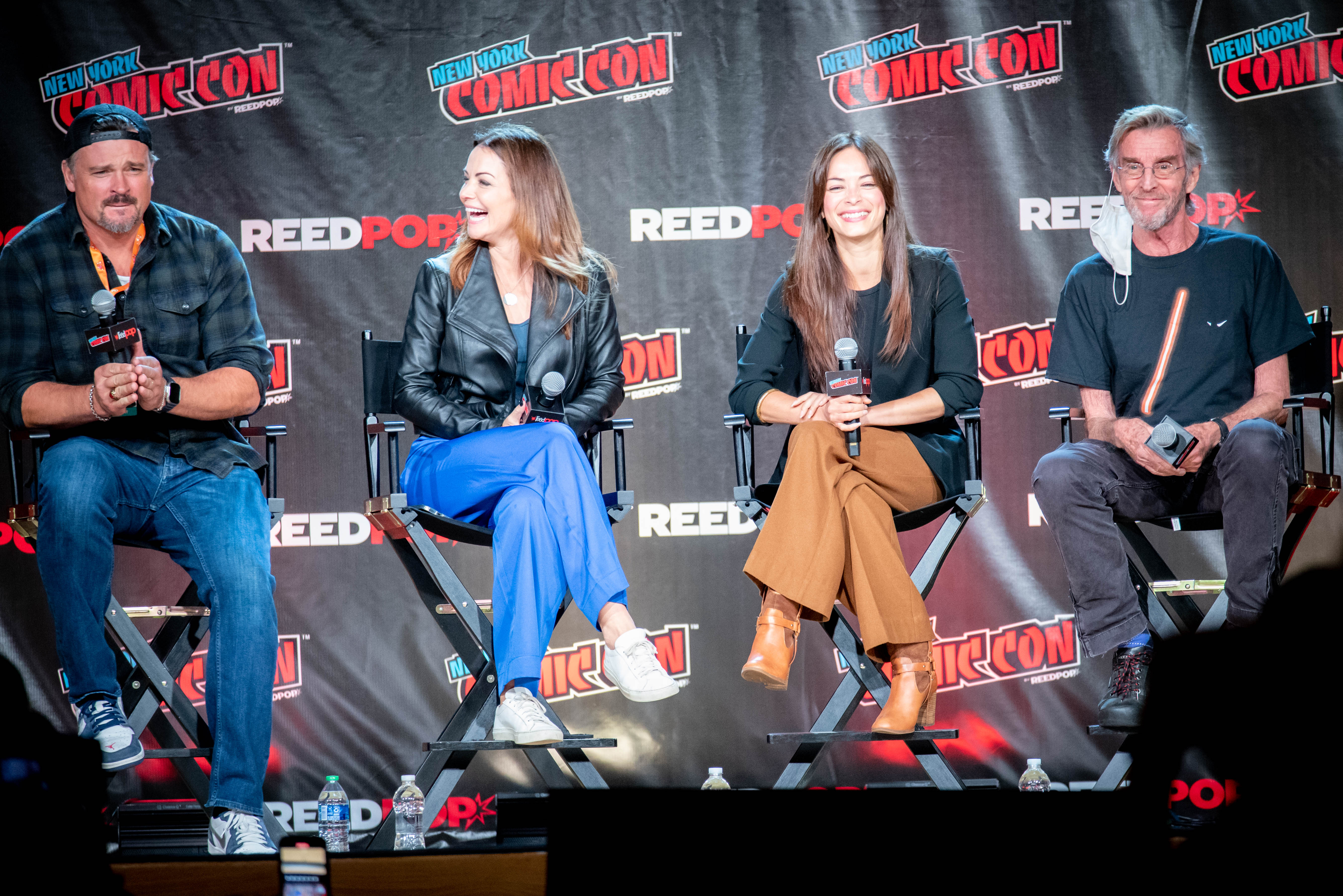
Welling, Durance, Kreuk and Glover at the 2022 New York Comic Con

During its ten seasons, Smallville won awards ranging from Emmys to Teen Choice Awards. In 2002, the series won an Emmy for Outstanding Sound Editing for a Series for its pilot episode. Four years later, it received an Emmy for Outstanding Sound Editing for a Series for the fifth-season episode "Arrival". In 2008, Smallville again won an Outstanding Sound Editing for a Series Emmy for season seven's "Bizarro".

Smallville has received a number of Leo Awards. Make-up artist Natalie Cosco won two Leo Awards for Best Make-Up: for her work in the fourth-season episode "Scare" and in the sixth season's "Hypnotic" and "Wither". At the 2006 Leo Awards, Barry Donlevy won Best Cinematography in a Dramatic Series for his work on the fourth-season episode "Spirit" and David Willson won Best Production Design in a Dramatic Series for "Sacred". Smallville's sixth season won a Best Dramatic Series Leo. James Marshall won Best Direction for "Zod", Caroline Cranstoun won Best Costume Design for her work on "Arrow" and James Philpott won Best Production Design for "Justice". In 2008, Smallville won Leos for Best Dramatic Series and Best Cinematography. The visual-effects team was recognized for its work on the pilot with a 2002 Best Visual Effects Leo, and received 2004 VES Awards for Outstanding Compositing in a Televised Program, Music Video or Commercial for the second season's "Accelerate" and Outstanding Matte Painting in a Televised Program, Music Video, or Commercial for "Insurgence".

In 2002 the American Society of Composers, Authors and Publishers honored composer Mark Snow and Remy Zero, who provided the opening song "Save Me", for their contributions to the series; the award was given to individuals who wrote the theme (or underscore) for the highest-rated television series in 2001 for their network. The American Society of Cinematographers awarded David Moxness for the sixth season's "Arrow", giving Glen Winter the same award the following year for his work on "Noir". Series regulars have also won awards; in 2001, Michael Rosenbaum won a Saturn Award for Best Supporting Actor, and Tom Welling won a Teen Choice Award for Choice Breakout TV Star — Male in 2002. Allison Mack won the Teen Choice Best Sidekick award in 2006 and 2007, and in 2009 Welling received the Choice TV Actor Action Adventure award.

Millar stated that Smallville "visually and aesthetically, was a celebration of Americana", with aspects such as Clark's red, white, and blue apparel. Being an "idyllic portrait of America", he said, helped the show's popularity after the September 11 attacks on the United States. Actors reported that many United States military veterans told them of watching the show as a distraction from combat while serving overseas.

== Other media ==
Smallville has generated other media and spin-offs, from young-adult novels and comic books to Internet-based mini-episodes with characters from the series. It influenced the British TV series, Merlin.

=== Literature ===
Two series of novels have been published since Smallville's second season. A series of eight young-adult novels was published by Aspect Publishing from October 2002 to March 2004, and a second series of ten young-adult novels was published by Little, Brown Young Readers from October 2002 to April 2004. A bimonthly comic book series, which often tied into the series, was also published.

==== Young adult novels ====
Three novels were published on October 1, 2002: one by Aspect and two by Little, Brown Young Readers. The Aspect novel (Smallville: Strange Visitors) was written by Roger Stern, with Clark and his friends trying to uncover the truth about two religious con men who set up shop in Smallville and use kryptonite in their spiritual seminars to rob the townspeople. Little, Brown Young Readers first published Arrival by Michael Teitelbaum, chronicling the series' pilot. The second novel (See No Evil, by series writers Cherie Bennett and Jeff Gottesfeld) follows Dawn Mills, a young actress who wants to attend Juilliard. Dawn, who can become invisible, wants to get revenge on the people who have been talking behind her back but is stopped by Clark. See No Evil was one of the original storylines for season one's "Shimmer".

On November 1, 2002, Aspect published Alan Grant's Smallville: Dragon, about an ex-convict who assumes the abilities and appearance of a dragon after he is exposed to kryptonite in a cave; the mutation drives him to try to kill everyone who testified against him. In the novel, Clark is hypnotized into believing that he is a normal teenager with no special abilities. A month after the publication of Grant's novel, Bennett and Gottesfeld wrote Little, Brown Young Readers' Flight, about a young girl (Tia) who Clark discovers has wings. He and his friends believe that Tia is being abused by her father, and teach her to overcome her fear of flying so she can find her mother. Flight (like See No Evil) was a planned episode, but the crew was uncertain that they could get the flying effects right and the idea was scrapped. Nancy Holder wrote the third novel in the Aspect series. Published on January 1, 2003, Hauntings follows Clark and his friends as they investigate a ghostly presence in a Smallville house. Little, Brown Young Readers then published Animal Rage by David Cody Weiss and Bobbi Weiss, about animal-rights activist Heather Fox (who can change into any animal she touches). Heather uses this ability to harm people who hurt animals until Clark discovers it and stops her. Aspect published Dean Wesley Smith's Whodunit, in which Clark, Chloe, Lana and Pete investigate the murder of a boy and his sister while Lex tries to decide whether to ransom his kidnapped father or try rescuing Lionel himself.

Little, Brown Young Readers published the next two books in April and June 2003. The first, Speed, was written by Cherie Bennett and Jeff Gottesfeld. In it, a boy uses an hourglass his father gave him for his birthday to stop time and commit hate crimes without being caught. Clark stops him before he disrupts a local multicultural festival. The second, Buried Secrets, was written by Suzan Colón. In it, Clark and Lex fall in love with a mind-reading substitute Spanish teacher, jeopardizing their friendship.

On September 9, 2003, Aspect published Diana G. Gallagher's Shadows, about a girl and her father who move to Smallville; the father creates murderous monsters. Jonathan assumes that the deaths are related to LuthorCorp, creating tension with his son. Clark discovers the truth to prove Lex's innocence, stopping the creatures before they can kill again. Colón returned to write Runaway, in which Clark runs away to the city and lives with other homeless teenagers; he falls in love with one of the girls before returning home. In Smallville: Silence by Nancy Holder, the characters investigate zombies in town. Little, Brown Young Readers published its eighth book, Greed, by Bennett and Gottesfeld in which Clark and his friends take summer jobs as counselors at a camp for disadvantaged youths. When a boy falls into Crater Lake, he develops the ability to foretell the future and Lionel tries to exploit this. Pete also tries to exploit Clark's abilities by tricking him into playing in a basketball game and betting on the outcome.

Alan Grant returned to write Curse, about a gravedigger who unleashes a 150-year-old curse onto Smallville and Clark's attempts to put things right. On February 1, 2004 Little, Brown Young Readers published Suzan Colón's Temptation, where Clark uses red kryptonite in an attempt to impress Lana and Chloe when they are infatuated with a French exchange student. Aspect published its final novel on March 1, 2004. Written by Devin K. Grayson, City follows Clark and Lex on a trip to Metropolis. In the city, they are caught between the Japanese Yakuza and a secret agent who thinks he has found an alien. In Little, Brown Young Readers' final novel, "Sparks" by Cherie Bennett and Jeff Gottesfeld, Chloe is hit by kryptonite sparks from a fireworks display. The sparks make Chloe the desire of every man, but when they wear off an admirer kidnaps her and she is rescued by Clark.

=== Comic books ===
==== Seasonal extensions ====
Smallville's first venture into comics was "Elemental", a one-off story by Gough and Millar which appeared in TV Guide during the series' first season and set in that period. Before the start of season two, DC Comics published a one-off comic based on the series. Titled Smallville: The Comic, it has two stories. The first, "Raptor" by Mark Verheiden and Roy Martinez, is about an abused boy who mutates into a velociraptor (thanks to kryptonite) and tries to get revenge on the Luthor family. Michael Green and John Paul Leon wrote "Exile and The Kingdom", with insight into why Lex remains in Smallville after his father offers him a position in Metropolis at the end of season one. DC Comics then began publishing a bimonthly comic with stories about Smallville characters. Writer and script coordinator Clint Carpenter called the comic a companion to the series rather than a non-canonical version. According to Carpenter, the series expands on events in the series (such as season-ending cliffhangers) and gives "additional depth" to characters with limited screen time on the series or whose storylines needed additional explanation. Carpenter was not the first person asked to oversee the comic; Mark Verheiden, who co-wrote the one-off comic, was originally intended to be in charge of the bimonthly series. Verheiden's commitment to the TV series kept him from working on the comic books, so he asked Carpenter to take them on. Although the comic book was intended to expand on the TV series, there was an occasional continuity overlap because of differences in production schedule between the comic and the series. In one instance, the comic book showed Clark robbing an ATM and the season-three premiere showed him robbing multiple ATMs. The series tied into the TV series, the Chloe Chronicles webisodes and Smallville-related webpages, with cast and crew interviews and information on the episodes' production. The comic series ended in January 2005 with #11, with no comics published until the Season Eleven series debut.

#	Title	Publisher	Year	ISBN	Reprints
1	Smallville	DC Comics	2004	ISBN 9781401202040	Collects The reprinted material is, in whole or in part, from: Smallville: The Comics #1 (November 2002) and Smallville #1–4 (March – November 2003)
1	Credits and full notes Writer(s) Penciller(s): Clint Carpenter; Michael Green; Mark Verheiden; Thomas Denrenick; Tom Derenick; Renato Guedes; John Paul Leon; Kilian Plunkett; John Van Fleet				Collects The reprinted material is, in whole or in part, from: Smallville: The Comics #1 (November 2002) and Smallville #1–4 (March – November 2003)

==== Smallville Season Eleven ====
The first digital issue of a Smallville Season Eleven comic book was released on April 13, 2012; the first print issue was published on May 2. In the comic book (written by Smallville executive story editor Bryan Q. Miller), set six months after Darkseid's attack, Clark no longer fights crime as "The Blur" but as "Superman". Although Clark is generally accepted by the public, some distrust him (including Lex Luthor, despite his memory loss after his encounter with Tess Mercer), and this worsens when he reveals himself as extraterrestrial. "Detective", a new series of adventures paralleling the TV series and the comic series' second arc, was published digitally on the title's off-week beginning January 4, 2013. A new arc, "Effigy", features a team-up of recurring character John Jones and Batman. DC Comics cancelled the series after nineteen issues at the end of the "Olympus" story arc, with the rest of the season-eleven story continuing as miniseries under the Season Eleven banner. In November 2014, Season Eleven concluded with the story arc "Continuity".

===== Main series =====
#	Title	Publisher	Year	ISBN	Reprints
1	Guardian	DC Comics	2013	ISBN 9781401238247	Collects The reprinted material is, in whole or in part, from: Smallville Season Eleven #1–4 (May 2012 – August 2012) **Digital releases (April 2012 – July 2012)
1	Credits and full notes: Writer(s) / Bryan Q. Miller; Penciller(s) / Pere Perez; Ryan Benjamin; Gary Frank; Cat Staggs; Saleem Crawford; Joel Benjamin; Six months after Darkseid's defeat, Clark enjoys the general acceptance from the public. Lex Luthor makes plans to destroy Superman, despite having lost all of his memories. In addition, Lex encounters his half-sister, Tess Mercer, and a visitor from a parallel Earth arrives to warn Clark about a "Crisis".				Collects The reprinted material is, in whole or in part, from: Smallville Season Eleven #1–4 (May 2012 – August 2012) **Digital releases (April 2012 – July 2012)
2	Detective	DC Comics	2013	ISBN 9781401240943	Collects The reprinted material is, in whole or in part, from: Smallville Season Eleven #5–8 (September 2012 – December 2012) **Digital releases (August 2012 – November 2012)
2	Credits and full notes: Writer(s) / Bryan Q. Miller; Penciller(s) / Chris Cross; Marc Deering; Jamal Igle; Mico Suayan; Gotham City's heroic duo, Batman and Nightwing, arrive into Metropolis to locate Thomas and Martha Wayne's killer, Joe Chill. They eventually team-up with Clark and his friends to battle against the Intergang, Oswald Loomis, and Victor Fries. Additionally, Chloe reveals a secret to Oliver, and Lex learns why Tess erased his memories.				Collects The reprinted material is, in whole or in part, from: Smallville Season Eleven #5–8 (September 2012 – December 2012) **Digital releases (August 2012 – November 2012)
3	Haunted	DC Comics	2013	ISBN 9781401242916	Collects The reprinted material is, in whole or in part, from: Smallville Season Eleven #9–12 (January 2013 – April 2013) **Digital releases (December 2012 – March 2013)
3	Credits and full notes: Writer(s) / Bryan Q. Miller; Penciller(s) / Jorge Jimenez; Pere Perez; Cat Staggs; Scott Kolins; Bart Allen returns and meets with the Justice Society of America Jay Garrick. Lex is determined to learn Tess's secrets regarding Superman and his allies, and Chloe learns about her deceased parallel universe counterpart. This is chronologically parallel to the interlude story arc Effigy.				Collects The reprinted material is, in whole or in part, from: Smallville Season Eleven #9–12 (January 2013 – April 2013) **Digital releases (December 2012 – March 2013)
4	Argo	DC Comics	2014	ISBN 9781401246372	Collects The reprinted material is, in whole or in part, from: Smallville Season Eleven #13–15, Smallville Season Eleven Special #2 (May 2013 – July 2013)
4	Credits and full notes: Writer(s) / Bryan Q. Miller; Penciller(s) / Daniel HDR; Pete Woods; Clark and Michael Jon Carter (Booster Gold) travel to the 31st century to team-up with the Legion of Super-Heroes trying to stop war between Earth and an unexpected enemy, Kara. This is chronologically parallel to the interlude story arc Valkyrie.				Collects The reprinted material is, in whole or in part, from: Smallville Season Eleven #13–15, Smallville Season Eleven Special #2 (May 2013 – July 2013)
5	Olympus	DC Comics	2014	ISBN 9781401250768	Collects The reprinted material is, in whole or in part, from: Smallville Season Eleven #16–19 (August 2013 – November 2013)
5	Credits and full notes: Writer(s) / Bryan Q. Miller; Penciller(s) / Jorge Jimenez; Cat Staggs; Twenty years ago, a young Steve Trevor washed up on the island of Themyscira and met the Amazon princess Diana. Now, Diana and Trevor finds the latter's mother disappears, and their search for her leading them face-to-face with Clark. This is chronologically parallel to the story arc Hollow. The main series ended after #19, and the rest of Season Eleven continues through mini-series.				Collects The reprinted material is, in whole or in part, from: Smallville Season Eleven #16–19 (August 2013 – November 2013)

Note: The full title of all volumes listed here start with "Smallville Season 11: ".

===== Interlude series =====
#	Title	Publisher	Year	ISBN	Reprints
1	Effigy	DC Comics	2013		Collects The reprinted material is, in whole or in part, from: Smallville: Season 11 Special – Chapter 28: Effigy, Part 1 (digital release: January 4, 2013); Smallville: Season 11 Special- Chapter 32: Effigy, Part 2 (digital release: February 1, 2013); Smallville: Season 11 Special- Chapter 36: Effigy, Part 3 (digital release: March 1, 2013); Smallville: Season 11 Special – Chapter 37: Effigy, Part 4 (digital release: March 8, 2013)
1	Credits and full notes: Writer(s) / Bryan Q. Miller; Penciller(s) / Jorge Jimenez; Cat Staggs; After an attack from a White Martian has left Barbara Gordon injured, John Jones arrives and offers Bruce Wayne his assistance on the investigation. This is chronologically parallel to the story arc Haunted.				Collects The reprinted material is, in whole or in part, from: Smallville: Season 11 Special – Chapter 28: Effigy, Part 1 (digital release: January 4, 2013); Smallville: Season 11 Special- Chapter 32: Effigy, Part 2 (digital release: February 1, 2013); Smallville: Season 11 Special- Chapter 36: Effigy, Part 3 (digital release: March 1, 2013); Smallville: Season 11 Special – Chapter 37: Effigy, Part 4 (digital release: March 8, 2013)
2	Valkyrie	DC Comics	2013		Collects The reprinted material is, in whole or in part, from: Smallville: Season 11 – Chapter 41: Valkyrie, Part 1 (digital release: April 5, 2013); Smallville: Season 11 – Chapter 45: Valkyrie, Part 2 (digital release: May 3, 2013); Smallville: Season 11 – Chapter 46: Valkyrie, Part 3 (digital release: May 10, 2013); Smallville: Season 11 – Chapter 50: Valkyrie, Part 4 (digital release: June 7, 2013)
2	Credits and full notes: Writer(s) / Bryan Q. Miller; As Clark travels to the 31st century with Michael Carter (Booster Gold) to avert a future war, Lois meets Lana at Cameroon. This is chronologically parallel to the story arc Argo.				Collects The reprinted material is, in whole or in part, from: Smallville: Season 11 – Chapter 41: Valkyrie, Part 1 (digital release: April 5, 2013); Smallville: Season 11 – Chapter 45: Valkyrie, Part 2 (digital release: May 3, 2013); Smallville: Season 11 – Chapter 46: Valkyrie, Part 3 (digital release: May 10, 2013); Smallville: Season 11 – Chapter 50: Valkyrie, Part 4 (digital release: June 7, 2013)
3	Hollow	DC Comics	2013		Collects The reprinted material is, in whole or in part, from:
3	Credits and full notes: Writer(s) / Bryan Q. Miller; Penciller(s) / Jorge Jimenez; Beni Lobel; Tess finds herself that she must make a choice: should she initiate her revenge on Lex for her death, or to become the hero everyone believe her to be.				Collects The reprinted material is, in whole or in part, from:
4	Titans	DC Comics	2014		Collects The reprinted material is, in whole or in part, from:
4	Credits and full notes: Writer(s) / Bryan Q. Miller; Penciller(s) / Cat Staggs; Jay Garrick leads the Teen Titans to against an enemy who is determine to ensure that there will not be a next generation of superheroes. Conner Kent, Mia Dearden, and Jaime Reyes appear in the story.				Collects The reprinted material is, in whole or in part, from:

Note: The full title of all volumes listed here start with "Smallville Season 11 Specials: ".

=== Chloe Chronicles ===
Allison Mack's character, Chloe Sullivan, has starred in two promotional tie-in series: Smallville: Chloe Chronicles, and Vengeance Chronicles. Two volumes of Chloe Chronicles totaled eleven mini-episodes. In the first volume Chloe investigated events leading to the death of Earl Jenkins, who held Chloe and her friends hostage at the LuthorCorp plant in the first-season episode "Jitters". It aired from April 29 to May 20, 2003 to AOL subscribers. After the first volume received positive responses from viewers, the second volume was created as a continuation with Sam Jones III as Pete Ross. This volume used the Smallville comic books as a secondary tie-in to the series. Viewers could watch Smallville, Chloe's Chronicles and finish with the Smallville comic book, which would provide an "enhanced backstory to the online segments". The later series, Vengeance Chronicles, is a spin-off of the fifth-season episode "Vengeance". In this series Chloe joins a costumed vigilante, whom she calls the "Angel of Vengeance", to expose Lex Luthor's Level 33.1 experiments on meteor-infected people.

The idea for an online show about Chloe originated with Mark Warshaw, who ran the show's website and was in charge of the DVDs. The series intended to wrap up "unfinished business" from the television show. Although Smallville: Chloe Chronicles began on AOL, it made its way to the United Kingdom's Channel 4 website. According to Lisa Gregorian, senior vice president for television of Warner Bros. Marketing Services, their goal was to create companion programming that offers new and exciting ways to engage the audience, just as music videos did for record promotion. Allison Mack described the show as "very Nancy Drew and mysterious": "I think it's a bit more like The X-Files or NYPD Blue. The Chronicles are like a detective story, with Chloe following clues and interviewing people, going from spot to spot, figuring things out". The scripts were written by Brice Tidwell; Mack was given script approval for the series, allowing her to review and make changes to the script. Warshaw communicated with Gough and Millar to expand Smallville stories in Chloe's Chronicles.

=== Promotional tie-ins ===
For the season-three premiere, the Smallville producers teamed up with Verizon to enable its registered users to view plot updates (as Daily Planet press releases), quizzes and games related to the show with Verizon product placement. Smallville Legends: The Oliver Queen Chronicles, a six-episode CGI series which chronicled the early life of Oliver Queen/Green Arrow, was released in a promotional tie-in with Sprint. According to Warner Bros. Television Group executive vice-president of worldwide marketing Lisa Gregorian, the promotional tie-ins got fans more connected to the show. In April 2007 a tie-in with Toyota promoting the Toyota Yaris featured an online comic strip, Smallville Legends: Justice & Doom, as an interstitial program during new Smallville episodes. The interactive comic was based on the "Justice" episode, which follows Oliver Queen, Bart Allen, Victor Stone and Arthur Curry (the initial members of the "Justice League" in Smallville) as they seek to destroy LuthorCorp's secret experimental labs. The online series allowed viewers to investigate with the fictional team to win prizes. Stephan Nilson wrote all five episodes, working with a team of artists on the illustrations. Nilson received the plot for each comic episode as Smallville's production crew was filming its current television episode. Artist Steve Scott drew comic book panels which were sent to Motherland, a consulting group. Motherland reviewed the drawings, telling Scott which images to draw on a separate overlay; this allowed objects to be moved in and out of a frame.

In 2008 The CW joined the manufacturers of Stride gum to give viewers an opportunity to create their own Smallville digital comic, Smallville: Visions. The writers and producers developed the comic's beginning and end, allowing viewers to provide the middle. The CW began its tie-in campaign with the March 13, 2008 episode "Hero", where Pete develops superhuman elasticity after chewing kryptonite-infused Stride gum. On The CW's website, viewers voted on one of two options (each adding four pages to the comic) every Tuesday and Thursday until the campaign ended on April 7. In season seven Smallville again worked with Sprint, bringing its customers "mobisodes" titled Smallville Legends: Kara and the Chronicles of Krypton with Clark's cousin Kara.

=== Spin-offs ===
Gough and Millar developed an Aquaman pilot for the WB, with Justin Hartley as Aquaman (Arthur Curry). As work progressed on the Smallville season-five episode "Aqua", although the episode was not intended as a backdoor pilot for an Aquaman spin-off the character was seen as having potential for his own series. Alan Ritchson was not considered for the role in the new series, because Gough and Millar did not consider it a Smallville spin-off. Gough said in November 2005 that the series was to be a different version of the 'Aquaman' legend and suggested a crossover with Smallville at some point. Although the pilot was given a good chance of being picked up, when the WB and UPN merged into The CW the new network passed on the show.

During the sixth season there was talk of spinning off the Green Arrow into his own series, but Hartley refused to talk about the possibility of a spin-off because of his role on Smallville. The actor felt it his duty to respect what the show had accomplished in five seasons, and not "steal the spotlight" because there was "talk" of a spin-off after his two appearances. According to Hartley, "talking" was as far as the spin-off idea ever got. Steven DeKnight revealed that a spin-off Justice League series was expected to happen after the episode "Justice", and would have continued the story of Oliver and his new team.

=== Arrowverse ===
Tom Welling and Erica Durance reprised their roles as Clark Kent and Lois Lane for the Arrowverse crossover event "Crisis on Infinite Earths". The crossover retroactively establishes the events of Smallville as taking place on Earth-167 and depicts a Clark who has given up his powers and taken over the Kent farm, where he and Lois raise their two daughters. While discussing the Smallville episode "Persona" in 2025, Welling provided some context to Clark's powerless state in the crossover. According to him, Clark was using Blue Kryptonite, like Dax-Ur in "Persona". Within the context of Smallville, Blue Kryptonite strips a Kryptonian of their powers as long as they are exposed to it. In "Persona", Dax-Ur wore a piece of Blue Kryptonite in a bracelet. If the bracelet was removed, his powers would instantly return. In the Smallville episode "Hereafter", Jordan Cross has a vision of Clark, in a distant future, as Superman. He then describes Clark as not having an ending, but going on forever.

In the Crisis Aftermath aftershow, Marc Guggenheim describes the scene as ten years after the viewers last saw Welling's Clark and Durance's Lois. Chronologically, the last appearance of them had been in 2018 in the series finale.

Michael Rosenbaum was approached about reprising his role as Lex Luthor, but he declined when Warner Bros. did not show him a script, tell him what his character was going to do, nor let him know when he was going to film (it was referred in the scene that Lex was President). Alan Ritchson, who played Arthur Curry / Aquaman on the series, was also approached to reprise his role in the crossover but turned it down due to scheduling commitments with Titans. Despite this, Ritchson did make an uncredited cameo appearance in the crossover as his Titans character, Hank Hall / Hawk, through archival footage from that series.

The crossover ends with the birth of a new multiverse. Smallville or Earth-167 does not appear in the montage of new universes, which depicts Earth-2 now being the home of Stargirl, while Earth-19 is now the home of the 2019 Swamp Thing television series. In the Titans episode "Dude, Where's My Gar?", Gar Logan (Beast Boy) travels this new multiverse. After briefly visiting Earth-2 (the universe of Stargirl), he continues traveling the multiverse, where he sees or hears different universes (represented by archival footage or audio) inhabited by Christopher Reeve's Superman, Adam West's Batman, the DC Extended Universe, Swamp Thing (2019), Smallville, among others. With Smallville, no footage is shown. Only the voice of Dr. Fate saying that Clark's fate is "binding."

=== Possible animated series revival ===
In 2021, Tom Welling and his Smallville co-star Michael Rosenbaum were developing an animated series revival to the series and hoped to "use as many of the original cast members as possible". He and Rosenbaum were preparing a pitch of the series for Warner Bros., and they delivered to them in January 2022. John Glover, Sam Jones III, Kristin Kreuk and Erica Durance, and original series showrunners, Gough and Millar, were said to return, with the exception of Allison Mack due to sex trafficking charges made against her for which she was convicted and imprisoned. The series was said to be in some stage of pre-production or production, but still alive, according to Durance.

== Home media ==
Seasons one through ten have been released on DVD in Regions 1, 2 and 4. Seasons five and six were also released in the HD DVD format on November 28, 2006 and September 18, 2007, respectively. Seasons six, seven, eight, nine and ten have been released for Blu-ray. The DVD releases include deleted scenes, behind-the-scenes featurettes and commentary by cast and crew members on selected episodes. The promotional tie-ins Chloe Chronicles and Vengeance Chronicles accompanied the season two, three and five box sets. Other special features include interactive functionality (such as a tour of Smallville), a comic book and DVD-ROM material.

For the 20th anniversary, the complete series was released for the first time on Blu-ray on October 16, 2021. Season one is the only season to be produced in standard-definition; all subsequent seasons were produced in high definition. The 20th Anniversary Blu-ray release contains the original standard-definition of season one, upscaled; with seasons two, three, and four in their native high-definition for the first time. It also marks the first time season five being released on Blu-ray. Season five had previously been released in high definition on HD-DVD only. The Blu-ray release was repackaged and re-rereleased on February 25, 2024. This version of the Complete Series includes all 218 episodes on Blu-ray and 2 DVDs with hours of bonus features.

Complete Season	Release dates		
Complete Season	Region 1	Region 2	Region 4
1st	September 23, 2003	October 13, 2003	December 3, 2003
2nd	May 18, 2004	September 17, 2004	January 1, 2005
3rd	November 16, 2004	April 18, 2005	July 13, 2005
4th	September 13, 2005	October 10, 2005	November 11, 2006
5th	September 12, 2006	August 28, 2006	April 4, 2007
6th	September 18, 2007	October 22, 2007	March 5, 2008
7th	September 9, 2008	October 13, 2008	March 3, 2009
8th	August 25, 2009	October 12, 2009	March 31, 2010
9th	September 7, 2010	October 25, 2010	June 22, 2011
10th	November 29, 2011	October 17, 2011	April 4, 2012
Complete series	November 29, 2011	October 17, 2011	August 1, 2012

Season	Smallville Blu-ray releases			
Season	Region A		Region B	
Season	United States	Canada	United Kingdom	Australia
6th	September 18, 2007	October 9, 2007	October 13, 2008	March 3, 2009
7th	September 9, 2008		October 13, 2008	March 3, 2009
8th	August 25, 2009		October 12, 2009	March 31, 2010
9th	September 7, 2010		October 25, 2010	June 22, 2011
10th	November 29, 2011		October 17, 2011	April 4, 2012

== Merchandise ==
Since Smallville began airing, a variety of merchandise connected with the series has been produced. Two soundtrack albums of songs from the show have been released. Smallville: The Talon Mix, with a group of artists who licensed their music for the show, was issued on February 25, 2003. Smallville: The Metropolis Mix, with another group of artists, was released on November 8, 2005. In addition to the soundtracks, action figures, T-shirts, hats and posters have been produced. In December 2002 autographed Smallville merchandise was listed for auction on eBay, with the proceeds going to charity. In 2003, Titan Magazines began publishing a monthly Smallville magazine with cast and crew interviews, information on Smallville merchandise and photos. The 34th and final issue was published in November 2009.

Titan Books published companion volumes for each season with cast and crew interviews, episode descriptions and behind-the-scenes photos. On September 1, 2004, the company published its first companion for the series. Written by Paul Simpson, the book has sixteen pages of color photos of the cast. On March 1, 2005 Titan Books published its season-two companion, also written by Simpson, which details the series' special effects. Titan published the third-season companion on September 1, the last written by Simpson. He described the episodes' plots, discussing the neglect of the Martha Kent character and the failure of the Adam Knight storyline. Titan Books released the fourth-season companion by Craig Byrne, who wrote the subsequent companion books, on September 4, 2007. It contains interviews with the cast and crew and color photos of the production. Titan published the season-five companion on December 26, 2007. The season-six companion, with an introduction by Justin Hartley, was published on March 25, 2008. The season-seven companion (Titan's last) has a foreword by Laura Vandervoort, a reflection on the "Smallville phenomenon" and a discussion of Gough and Millar's departure.

In 2010, the Smallville Roleplaying Game was released by Margaret Weis Productions using its Cortex Plus System. Using the series' season-nine setting, it includes rules for earlier seasons. Two supplements, the High School Yearbook and the Watchtower Report, were produced. Players can play the characters from Smallville, or create their own spin-off of the series. Ultimate Smallville Soundtrack, a five-CD box set with 100 songs from the series' 10 seasons, was released by Vicious Records in May 2013 with all profits benefiting the Christopher and Dana Reeve Foundation.

== See also ==
- Gotham (TV series)
- Krypton (TV series)
- Superman franchise cast
