= Batter =

Batter or batters may refer to:

== Common meanings ==
- Batter (cooking), thin dough that can be easily poured into a pan
- Batter (baseball), person whose turn it is to face the pitcher
- Batter (cricket), a player who is currently batting
- Batter (drum), a part of a snare drum
- Batter (crime), unlawful physical actions to a person
- Batter (tort), tort of bringing about an unconsented harmful or offensive contact with a person
- Batter (walls), an intentional slope of walls or earthworks

== People ==
- Dave Batters (1969–2009), Canadian businessman and politician, husband of Denise
- Denise Batters (born 1970), Canadian politician, wife of Dave
- Doris Batter (1922–2002), British sprinter
- Elmer Batters (1919–1997), pioneer fetish photographer
- Jeff Batters (1970–1996), professional ice hockey player

== Other uses ==
- BATTeRS, a Japanese project to find asteroids

== See also ==
- Battered (disambiguation)
- Batter up (disambiguation)
- Batman (disambiguation)
- Batwoman (disambiguation)
- Batgirl (disambiguation)
- Bat boy (disambiguation)
- Bat (disambiguation)
