= Battered =

Battered may refer to:

- Batter (cooking)
- Battered (band)
- Battered (album)
- Battered (1978 film), a 1978 TV movie directed by Peter Werner
- Battered (film), a 1989 documentary directed by Lee Grant

== See also ==
- Batter (disambiguation)
- Battered person syndrome
- Battered woman defense
