= Batman 3 =

Batman 3 may refer to:

- Batman Forever, the third film in Tim Burton and Joel Schumacher's Batman film series
- The Dark Knight Rises, the third film in Christopher Nolan's The Dark Knight trilogy
- Batman: Arkham Origins, the third video game in the Batman: Arkham series
- Lego Batman 3: Beyond Gotham
- Batman: Year Three, a 1989 comic book storyline written by Marv Wolfman
- Dick Grayson, the third Batman following Azrael's stint as Batman during "Knightfall"

== See also ==
- Batman (disambiguation)
- Batman 1 (disambiguation)
- Batman 2 (disambiguation)
