= Batwoman (disambiguation) =

Batwoman is a fictional character appearing in comic books published by DC Comics.

Batwoman or Bat Woman may also refer to:

== DC Comics topics ==
- Batwoman, an identity that multiple DC Comics characters have used
  - Kathy Kane, the first Batwoman
  - Kate Kane, the second Batwoman
- Batwoman (TV series), a CW TV series
  - Kate Kane (Arrowverse), the first Batwoman
  - Ryan Wilder, the second Batwoman
- Batwoman (comic book), a monthly comic series published by DC Comics

== Other uses ==
- A woman batman (military)
- Shi Zhengli, a Chinese researcher studying bat coronaviruses at the Wuhan Institute of Virology
- The English title of the Mexican movie La mujer murciélago

== See also ==
- Batswoman
- Batman (disambiguation)
- Batgirl (disambiguation)
- Batter (disambiguation)
