= Batter up =

Batter up or Batter Up may refer to:

== Baseball ==
- a baseball term
- Batter-Up Baseball, 1950s/1960s card game
- Batter Up, a 1991 Sega Game Gear video game
- Super Batter Up, 1992 Super NES video game
- Batter Up, a 1994 console video game accessory

== Television episodes ==
- "Batter Up" (1991), Back to the Future: The Animated Series
- "Batter Up" (2005), The Closer
- "Batter Up" (2007), Design Squad
- "Batter Up" (2011), American Restoration

== Music ==
- "Batter Up" (St. Lunatics song), 2001
- "Batter Up" (BabyMonster song), 2023
- "Batter Up", 1957 jazz song by Russ Freeman on the album Double Play!
- "Batter Up", a 2000 song by Nelly on the album Country Grammar
- "Batter Up", 2008 song on the No More Heroes soundtrack
- "Batter Up", 2010 hard rock instrument song by Paul Gilbert on the album Fuzz Universe

== Other ==
- Batter (cooking), a flour mixture used before frying
- Batter Up, thoroughbred horse and winner of the Sorority Stakes (1961), Black-Eyed Susan Stakes (1962), and Miss Woodford Stakes (1962) horseraces
- Batter Up Wombat, a 2008 children's book by Helen Lester
- Batter Up, a publication produced by American company Dawn Foods

== See also ==
- Batter (disambiguation)
- Up (disambiguation)
