= Batman 2 =

Batman 2 may refer to:

- Batman Returns, the 1992 sequel to the 1989 film Batman
- The Dark Knight, the 2008 sequel to the 2005 film Batman Begins
- The Batman: Part II, the upcoming sequel to the 2022 film The Batman
- Batman and Robin (serial), the 1949 sequel to the 1943 Batman serial
- Batman: Return of the Joker, the 1991 sequel to the 1989 video game Batman: The Video Game
- Batman: Arkham City, the 2011 sequel to the 2009 video game Batman: Arkham Asylum
- Batman: The Enemy Within, the 2017 sequel to the 2016 video game Batman: The Telltale Series
- Lego Batman 2: DC Super Heroes, the 2012 sequel to the 2008 video game Lego Batman: The Videogame
- Batman (Terry McGinnis), the second incarnation of Batman from the animated series Batman Beyond
- Batman (Earth-Two), an alternate version of Batman
- Batman: Year Two, a 1987 comic story arc written by Mike W. Barr
- Jean-Paul Valley, the second character to use the Batman mantle during the "Knightfall" comic book storyline

== See also ==
- Batman (disambiguation)
- Batman 1 (disambiguation)
- Batman 3 (disambiguation)
