= List of Smallville episodes =

Smallville is an American superhero television series developed by Miles Millar and Alfred Gough for The WB and The CW. The series follows the life of Clark Kent (Tom Welling), beginning when he is a teenager in the town of Smallville, Kansas, and continuing through high school, college, and his start at the Daily Planet before he adopts the "Superman" persona.

As the series progresses, Clark Kent copes with his emerging superpowers (x-ray vision, super hearing, etc.), explores his extraterrestrial origins, and discovers his true destiny. The series also deals with the people in Clark Kent's life: his human parents, Jonathan Kent (John Schneider) and Martha Kent (Annette O'Toole); his friends Chloe Sullivan (Allison Mack) and Pete Ross (Sam Jones III); his love interest for seven seasons Lana Lang (Kristin Kreuk); Chloe's cousin and Clark's love interest since season eight, Lois Lane (Erica Durance); and his friendship with Lex Luthor (Michael Rosenbaum) and how this gradually decays into their mutual enmity of legend.

During the course of the series, 217 episodes of Smallville aired over ten seasons, between October 16, 2001, and May 13, 2011.

== Series overview ==
Season	Episodes	Originally released			Average viewership (in millions)
Season	Episodes	First released	Last released	Network	Average viewership (in millions)
1	21	October 16, 2001	May 21, 2002	The WB	6.41
2	23	September 24, 2002	May 20, 2003	The WB	7.77
3	22	October 1, 2003	May 19, 2004	The WB	5.64
4	22	September 22, 2004	May 18, 2005	The WB	5.02
5	22	September 29, 2005	May 11, 2006	The WB	5.32
6	22	September 28, 2006	May 17, 2007	The CW	4.52
7	20	September 27, 2007	May 15, 2008	The CW	4.15
8	22	September 18, 2008	May 14, 2009	The CW	3.88
9	21	September 25, 2009	May 14, 2010	The CW	2.38
10	22	September 24, 2010	May 13, 2011	The CW	2.54

== Episodes ==
=== Season 1 (2001–02) ===
No. overall	No. in season	Title	Directed by	Written by	Original release date	Prod. code	U.S. viewers (millions)
1	1	"Pilot"	David Nutter	Alfred Gough & Miles Millar	October 16, 2001	475165	8.35
2	2	"Metamorphosis"	Michael Watkins & Philip Sgriccia	Alfred Gough & Miles Millar	October 23, 2001	227601	7.34
3	3	"Hothead"	Greg Beeman	Greg Walker	October 30, 2001	227603	6.02
4	4	"X-Ray"	James Frawley	Mark Verheiden	November 6, 2001	227604	6.63
5	5	"Cool"	James A. Contner	Michael Green	November 13, 2001	227605	5.94
6	6	"Hourglass"	Chris Long	Doris Egan	November 20, 2001	227606	6.36
7	7	"Craving"	Philip Sgriccia	Michael Green	November 27, 2001	227607	7.39
8	8	"Jitters"	Michael Watkins	Cherie Bennett & Jeff Gottesfeld	December 11, 2001	227602	5.82
9	9	"Rogue"	David Carson	Mark Verheiden	January 15, 2002	227608	5.78
10	10	"Shimmer"	D. J. Caruso	Mark Verheiden & Michael Green	January 29, 2002	227609	7.02
11	11	"Hug"	Chris Long	Doris Egan	February 5, 2002	227610	6.38
12	12	"Leech"	Greg Beeman	Timothy Schlattmann	February 12, 2002	227611	6.07
13	13	"Kinetic"	Robert Singer	Philip Levens	February 26, 2002	227612	6.20
14	14	"Zero"	Michael Katleman	Story by : Alfred Gough & Miles Millar; Teleplay by : Mark Verheiden	March 12, 2002	227613	6.90
15	15	"Nicodemus"	James Marshall	Story by : Greg Walker; Teleplay by : Michael Green	March 19, 2002	227614	6.74
16	16	"Stray"	Paul Shapiro	Philip Levens	April 16, 2002	227615	6.03
17	17	"Reaper"	Terrence O'Hara	Cameron Litvack	April 23, 2002	227616	5.48
18	18	"Drone"	Michael Katleman	Michael Green & Philip Levens	April 30, 2002	227617	5.68
19	19	"Crush"	James Marshall	Philip Levens & Alfred Gough & Miles Millar	May 7, 2002	227618	6.42
20	20	"Obscura"	Terrence O'Hara	Story by : Greg Walker; Teleplay by : Mark Verheiden & Michael Green	May 14, 2002	227619	6.10
21	21	"Tempest"	Greg Beeman	Story by : Philip Levens; Teleplay by : Alfred Gough & Miles Millar	May 21, 2002	227620	5.96

=== Season 2 (2002–03) ===
No. overall	No. in season	Title	Directed by	Written by	Original release date	Prod. code	U.S. viewers (millions)
22	1	"Vortex"	Greg Beeman	Story by : Alfred Gough & Miles Millar; Teleplay by : Philip Levens	September 24, 2002	175051	8.66
23	2	"Heat"	James Marshall	Mark Verheiden	October 1, 2002	175052	8.07
24	3	"Duplicity"	Steve Miner	Todd Slavkin & Darren Swimmer	October 8, 2002	175053	8.82
25	4	"Red"	Jeff Woolnough	Jeph Loeb	October 15, 2002	175054	8.89
26	5	"Nocturne"	Rick Wallace	Brian Peterson & Kelly Souders	October 22, 2002	175055	8.29
27	6	"Redux"	Chris Long	Russel Friend & Garrett Lerner	October 29, 2002	227621	8.22
28	7	"Lineage"	Greg Beeman	Story by : Alfred Gough & Miles Millar; Teleplay by : Kenneth Biller	November 5, 2002	175056	9.38
29	8	"Ryan"	Terrence O'Hara	Philip Levens	November 12, 2002	175057	7.35
30	9	"Dichotic"	Craig Zisk	Mark Verheiden	November 19, 2002	175058	8.26
31	10	"Skinwalker"	Marita Grabiak	Story by : Mark Warshaw; Teleplay by : Brian Peterson & Kelly Souders	November 26, 2002	175059	8.55
32	11	"Visage"	William Gereghty	Todd Slavkin & Darren Swimmer	January 14, 2003	175060	7.27
33	12	"Insurgence"	James Marshall	Kenneth Biller & Jeph Loeb	January 21, 2003	175062	6.62
34	13	"Suspect"	Kenneth Biller	Mark Verheiden & Philip Levens	January 28, 2003	175061	7.46
35	14	"Rush"	Rick Rosenthal	Todd Slavkin & Darren Swimmer	February 4, 2003	175063	8.13
36	15	"Prodigal"	Greg Beeman	Brian Peterson & Kelly Souders	February 11, 2003	175064	7.43
37	16	"Fever"	Bill Gereghty	Matthew Okumura	February 18, 2003	175065	7.85
38	17	"Rosetta"	James Marshall	Alfred Gough & Miles Millar	February 25, 2003	175066	8.73
39	18	"Visitor"	Rick Rosenthal	Philip Levens	April 15, 2003	175067	5.91
40	19	"Precipice"	Thomas J. Wright	Clint Carpenter	April 22, 2003	175068	6.70
41	20	"Witness"	Rick Wallace	Mark Verheiden	April 29, 2003	175069	6.50
42	21	"Accelerate"	James Marshall	Story by : Todd Slavkin & Darren Swimmer; Teleplay by : Brian Peterson & Kelly Souders	May 6, 2003	175070	7.03
43	22	"Calling"	Terrence O'Hara	Kenneth Biller	May 13, 2003	175071	7.06
44	23	"Exodus"	Greg Beeman	Alfred Gough & Miles Millar	May 20, 2003	175072	7.53

=== Season 3 (2003–04) ===
No. overall	No. in season	Title	Directed by	Written by	Original release date	Prod. code	U.S. viewers (millions)
45	1	"Exile"	Greg Beeman	Alfred Gough & Miles Millar	October 1, 2003	176201	6.82
46	2	"Phoenix"	James Marshall	Kelly Souders & Brian Peterson	October 8, 2003	176202	6.74
47	3	"Extinction"	Michael Katleman	Todd Slavkin & Darren Swimmer	October 15, 2003	176203	6.47
48	4	"Slumber"	Terrence O'Hara	Drew Z. Greenberg	October 22, 2003	176204	6.92
49	5	"Perry"	Jeannot Szwarc	Mark Verheiden	October 29, 2003	176205	6.71
50	6	"Relic"	Marita Grabiak	Kelly Souders & Brian Peterson	November 5, 2003	176206	6.72
51	7	"Magnetic"	David Jackson	Holly Harold	November 12, 2003	176207	6.87
52	8	"Shattered"	Ken Biller	Ken Biller	November 19, 2003	176208	6.36
53	9	"Asylum"	Greg Beeman	Todd Slavkin & Darren Swimmer	January 14, 2004	176209	5.61
54	10	"Whisper"	Tom Wright	Ken Horton	January 21, 2004	176210	5.09
55	11	"Delete"	Pat Williams	Kelly Souders & Brian Peterson	January 28, 2004	176211	5.47
56	12	"Hereafter"	Greg Beeman & James Marshall	Mark Verheiden & Drew Greenberg	February 4, 2004	176212	5.31
57	13	"Velocity"	Jeannot Szwarc	Todd Slavkin & Darren Swimmer	February 11, 2004	176213	5.01
58	14	"Obsession"	James Marshall	Holly Harold	February 18, 2004	176214	5.33
59	15	"Resurrection"	Terrence O'Hara	Todd Slavkin & Darren Swimmer	February 25, 2004	176215	4.97
60	16	"Crisis"	Ken Biller	Kelly Souders & Brian Peterson	March 3, 2004	176216	5.26
61	17	"Legacy"	Greg Beeman	Jeph Loeb	April 14, 2004	176217	4.48
62	18	"Truth"	James Marshall	Drew Greenberg	April 21, 2004	176218	4.43
63	19	"Memoria"	Miles Millar	Alfred Gough & Miles Millar	April 28, 2004	176219	4.32
64	20	"Talisman"	John Schneider	Ken Biller	May 5, 2004	176220	4.72
65	21	"Forsaken"	Terrence O'Hara	Kelly Souders & Brian Peterson	May 12, 2004	176221	4.54
66	22	"Covenant"	Greg Beeman	Story by : Todd Slavkin & Darren Swimmer; Teleplay by : Alfred Gough & Miles Millar	May 19, 2004	176222	5.92

=== Season 4 (2004–05) ===
No. overall	No. in season	Title	Directed by	Written by	Original release date	Prod. code	U.S. viewers (millions)
67	1	"Crusade"	Greg Beeman	Alfred Gough & Miles Millar	September 22, 2004	2T5201	6.07
68	2	"Gone"	James Marshall	Kelly Souders & Brian Peterson	September 29, 2004	2T5202	5.66
69	3	"Façade"	Pat Williams	Holly Harold	October 6, 2004	2T5204	5.45
70	4	"Devoted"	David Carson	Luke Schelhaas	October 13, 2004	2T5203	6.20
71	5	"Run"	David Barrett	Steven S. DeKnight	October 20, 2004	2T5205	5.41
72	6	"Transference"	James Marshall	Todd Slavkin & Darren Swimmer	October 27, 2004	2T5206	5.69
73	7	"Jinx"	Paul Shapiro	Mark Warshaw	November 3, 2004	2T5207	5.02
74	8	"Spell"	Jeannot Szwarc	Steven S. DeKnight	November 10, 2004	2T5208	5.51
75	9	"Bound"	Terrence O'Hara	Luke Schelhaas	November 17, 2004	2T5209	5.06
76	10	"Scare"	David Carson	Kelly Souders & Brian Peterson	December 1, 2004	2T5210	4.89
77	11	"Unsafe"	Greg Beeman	Steven S. DeKnight & Jeph Loeb	January 26, 2005	2T5211	4.21
78	12	"Pariah"	Paul Shapiro	Holly Harold	February 2, 2005	2T5212	4.78
79	13	"Recruit"	Jeannot Szwarc	Todd Slavkin & Darren Swimmer	February 9, 2005	2T5213	4.91
80	14	"Krypto"	James Marshall	Luke Schelhaas	February 16, 2005	2T5214	5.08
81	15	"Sacred"	Brad Turner	Kelly Souders & Brian Peterson	February 23, 2005	2T5215	5.26
82	16	"Lucy"	David Barrett	Story by : Neil Sadhu; Teleplay by : Neil Sadhu & Daniel Sulzberg	March 2, 2005	2T5216	4.51
83	17	"Onyx"	Terrence O'Hara	Steven S. DeKnight	April 13, 2005	2T5217	3.85
84	18	"Spirit"	Whitney Ransick	Luke Schelhaas	April 20, 2005	2T5218	4.39
85	19	"Blank"	Jeannot Szwarc	Kelly Souders & Brian Peterson	April 27, 2005	2T5219	4.59
86	20	"Ageless"	Steven S. DeKnight	Steven S. DeKnight	May 4, 2005	2T5220	4.51
87	21	"Forever"	James Marshall	Brian Peterson & Kelly Souders	May 11, 2005	2T5221	3.96
88	22	"Commencement"	Greg Beeman	Todd Slavkin & Darren Swimmer	May 18, 2005	2T5222	5.47

=== Season 5 (2005–06) ===
No. overall	No. in season	Title	Directed by	Written by	Original release date	Prod. code	U.S. viewers (millions)
89	1	"Arrival"	James Marshall	Todd Slavkin & Darren Swimmer	September 29, 2005	2T6401	5.90
90	2	"Mortal"	Terrence O'Hara	Steven S. DeKnight	October 6, 2005	2T6402	5.84
91	3	"Hidden"	Whitney Ransick	Kelly Souders & Brian Peterson	October 13, 2005	2T6403	5.92
92	4	"Aqua"	Bradford May	Todd Slavkin & Darren Swimmer	October 20, 2005	2T6406	6.40
93	5	"Thirst"	Paul Shapiro	Steven S. DeKnight	October 27, 2005	2T6404	5.78
94	6	"Exposed"	Jeannot Szwarc	Kelly Souders & Brian Peterson	November 3, 2005	2T6405	5.41
95	7	"Splinter"	James Marshall	Steven S. DeKnight	November 10, 2005	2T6408	5.51
96	8	"Solitude"	Paul Shapiro	Todd Slavkin & Darren Swimmer	November 17, 2005	2T6407	5.97
97	9	"Lexmas"	Rick Rosenthal	Holly Harold	December 8, 2005	2T6409	5.37
98	10	"Fanatic"	Michael Rohl	Wendy Mericle	January 12, 2006	2T6410	5.45
99	11	"Lockdown"	Peter Ellis	Steven S. DeKnight	January 19, 2006	2T6411	4.90
100	12	"Reckoning"	Greg Beeman	Kelly Souders & Brian Peterson	January 26, 2006	2T6412	6.28
101	13	"Vengeance"	Jeannot Szwarc	Al Septien & Turi Meyer	February 2, 2006	2T6413	5.37
102	14	"Tomb"	Whitney Ransick	Steven S. DeKnight	February 9, 2006	2T6414	5.41
103	15	"Cyborg"	Glen Winter	Caroline Dries	February 16, 2006	2T6415	6.24
104	16	"Hypnotic"	Michael Rohl	Todd Slavkin & Darren Swimmer	March 30, 2006	2T6416	4.78
105	17	"Void"	Jeannot Szwarc	Holly Harold	April 6, 2006	2T6417	4.24
106	18	"Fragile"	Tom Welling	Todd Slavkin & Darren Swimmer	April 13, 2006	2T6418	3.94
107	19	"Mercy"	James Marshall	Steven S. DeKnight	April 20, 2006	2T6419	4.41
108	20	"Fade"	Terrence O'Hara	Turi Meyer & Al Septien	April 27, 2006	2T6421	4.34
109	21	"Oracle"	Whitney Ransick	Story by : Neil Sadhu & Daniel Sulzberg; Teleplay by : Caroline Dries	May 4, 2006	2T6420	4.81
110	22	"Vessel"	James Marshall	Kelly Souders & Brian Peterson	May 11, 2006	2T6422	4.85

=== Season 6 (2006–07) ===
No. overall	No. in season	Title	Directed by	Written by	Original release date	Prod. code	U.S. viewers (millions)
111	1	"Zod"	James Marshall	Steven S. DeKnight	September 28, 2006	2T7701	4.96
112	2	"Sneeze"	Paul Shapiro	Todd Slavkin & Darren Swimmer	October 5, 2006	2T7702	4.52
113	3	"Wither"	Whitney Ransick	Tracy Bellomo	October 12, 2006	2T7703	4.88
114	4	"Arrow"	Michael Rohl	Brian Peterson & Kelly Souders	October 19, 2006	2T7704	4.71
115	5	"Reunion"	Jeannot Szwarc	Steven S. DeKnight	October 26, 2006	2T7706	4.79
116	6	"Fallout"	Glen Winter	Holly Harold	November 2, 2006	2T7707	5.01
117	7	"Rage"	Whitney Ransick	Todd Slavkin & Darren Swimmer	November 9, 2006	2T7708	4.46
118	8	"Static"	James Conway	Shintaro Shimosawa & James Morris	November 16, 2006	2T7709	4.70
119	9	"Subterranean"	Rick Rosenthal	Caroline Dries	December 7, 2006	2T7705	4.31
120	10	"Hydro"	Tom Welling	Brian Peterson & Kelly Souders	January 11, 2007	2T7710	4.68
121	11	"Justice"	Steven S. DeKnight	Steven S. DeKnight	January 18, 2007	2T7711	5.26
122	12	"Labyrinth"	Whitney Ransick	Al Septien & Turi Meyer	January 25, 2007	2T7712	5.00
123	13	"Crimson"	Glen Winter	Brian Peterson & Kelly Souders	February 1, 2007	2T7713	4.91
124	14	"Trespass"	Michael Rohl	Tracy A. Bellomo	February 8, 2007	2T7714	4.74
125	15	"Freak"	Michael Rosenbaum	Todd Slavkin & Darren Swimmer	February 15, 2007	2T7715	4.76
126	16	"Promise"	Rick Rosenthal	Kelly Souders & Brian Peterson	March 15, 2007	2T7716	4.69
127	17	"Combat"	James Marshall	Turi Meyer & Al Septien	March 22, 2007	2T7717	4.07
128	18	"Progeny"	Terrence O'Hara	Genevieve Sparling	April 19, 2007	2T7718	3.98
129	19	"Nemesis"	Mairzee Almas	Caroline Dries	April 26, 2007	2T7719	3.88
130	20	"Noir"	Jeannot Szwarc	Brian Peterson & Kelly Souders	May 3, 2007	2T7721	3.59
131	21	"Prototype"	Mat Beck	Steven S. DeKnight	May 10, 2007	2T7720	3.43
132	22	"Phantom"	James Marshall	Todd Slavkin & Darren Swimmer	May 17, 2007	2T7722	4.14

=== Season 7 (2007–08) ===
No. overall	No. in season	Title	Directed by	Written by	Original release date	Prod. code	U.S. viewers (millions)
133	1	"Bizarro"	Michael Rohl	Brian Peterson & Kelly Souders	September 27, 2007	3T6301	5.18
134	2	"Kara"	James Conway	Todd Slavkin & Darren Swimmer	October 4, 2007	3T6302	4.59
135	3	"Fierce"	Whitney Ransick	Holly Harold	October 11, 2007	3T6303	4.82
136	4	"Cure"	Rick Rosenthal	Al Septien & Turi Meyer	October 18, 2007	3T6304	5.18
137	5	"Action"	Mairzee Almas	Caroline Dries	October 25, 2007	3T6306	4.65
138	6	"Lara"	James Conway	Don Whitehead & Holly Henderson	November 1, 2007	3T6305	4.38
139	7	"Wrath"	Charles Beeson	Kelly Souders & Brian Peterson	November 8, 2007	3T6307	4.64
140	8	"Blue"	Glen Winter	Todd Slavkin & Darren Swimmer	November 15, 2007	3T6308	4.51
141	9	"Gemini"	Whitney Ransick	Caroline Dries	December 13, 2007	3T6309	3.71
142	10	"Persona"	Todd Slavkin	Don Whitehead & Holly Henderson	January 31, 2008	3T6310	3.81
143	11	"Siren"	Kevin G. Fair	Kelly Souders & Brian Peterson	February 7, 2008	3T6311	4.01
144	12	"Fracture"	James Marshall	Story by : Al Septien & Turi Meyer; Teleplay by : Caroline Dries	February 14, 2008	3T6312	3.67
145	13	"Hero"	Michael Rohl	Aaron & Todd Helbing	March 13, 2008	3T6313	3.80
146	14	"Traveler"	Glen Winter	Story by : Al Septien & Turi Meyer; Teleplay by : Don Whitehead & Holly Henderson	March 20, 2008	3T6314	3.44
147	15	"Veritas"	James Marshall	Kelly Souders & Brian Peterson	March 27, 2008	3T6315	3.86
148	16	"Descent"	Ken Horton	Don Whitehead & Holly Henderson	April 17, 2008	3T6316	3.61
149	17	"Sleeper"	Whitney Ransick	Caroline Dries	April 24, 2008	3T6317	3.62
150	18	"Apocalypse"	Tom Welling	Al Septien & Turi Meyer	May 1, 2008	3T6318	3.81
151	19	"Quest"	Kenneth Biller	Holly Harold	May 8, 2008	3T6319	3.99
152	20	"Arctic"	Todd Slavkin	Don Whitehead & Holly Henderson	May 15, 2008	3T6320	3.85

=== Season 8 (2008–09) ===
No. overall	No. in season	Title	Directed by	Written by	Original release date	Prod. code	U.S. viewers (millions)
153	1	"Odyssey"	Kevin G. Fair	Story by : Brian Peterson & Kelly Souders; Teleplay by : Todd Slavkin & Darren Swimmer	September 18, 2008	3T7451	4.34
154	2	"Plastique"	Rick Rosenthal	Don Whitehead & Holly Henderson	September 25, 2008	3T7452	4.18
155	3	"Toxic"	Mairzee Almas	Caroline Dries	October 2, 2008	3T7453	4.05
156	4	"Instinct"	James Conway	Al Septien & Turi Meyer	October 9, 2008	3T7454	4.12
157	5	"Committed"	Glen Winter	Bryan Q. Miller	October 16, 2008	3T7455	4.18
158	6	"Prey"	Michael Rohl	Kelly Souders & Brian Peterson	October 23, 2008	3T7456	4.16
159	7	"Identity"	Mairzee Almas	Todd Slavkin & Darren Swimmer	October 30, 2008	3T7457	4.32
160	8	"Bloodline"	Michael Rohl	Caroline Dries	November 6, 2008	3T7459	4.46
161	9	"Abyss"	Kevin G. Fair	Don Whitehead & Holly Henderson	November 13, 2008	3T7458	3.56
162	10	"Bride"	Jeannot Szwarc	Al Septien & Turi Meyer	November 20, 2008	3T7460	4.19
163	11	"Legion"	Glen Winter	Geoff Johns	January 15, 2009	3T7461	4.30
164	12	"Bulletproof"	Morgan Beggs	Bryan Miller	January 22, 2009	3T7462	3.85
165	13	"Power"	Allison Mack	Todd Slavkin & Darren Swimmer	January 29, 2009	3T7463	4.21
166	14	"Requiem"	Michael Rohl	Don Whitehead & Holly Henderson	February 5, 2009	3T7464	3.93
167	15	"Infamous"	Glen Winter	Caroline Dries	March 12, 2009	3T7465	3.57
168	16	"Turbulence"	Kevin G. Fair	Al Septien & Turi Meyer	March 19, 2009	3T7466	3.49
169	17	"Hex"	Mairzee Almas	Bryan Miller	March 26, 2009	3T7467	3.80
170	18	"Eternal"	James Marshall	Brian Peterson & Kelly Souders	April 2, 2009	3T7468	3.85
171	19	"Stiletto"	Kevin G. Fair	Caroline Dries	April 23, 2009	3T7469	3.10
172	20	"Beast"	Michael Rohl	Genevieve Sparling	April 30, 2009	3T7470	3.23
173	21	"Injustice"	Tom Welling	Al Septien & Turi Meyer	May 7, 2009	3T7471	3.39
174	22	"Doomsday"	James Marshall	Brian Peterson & Kelly Souders	May 14, 2009	3T7472	3.13

=== Season 9 (2009–10) ===
No. overall	No. in season	Title	Directed by	Written by	Original release date	Prod. code	U.S. viewers (millions)
175	1	"Savior"	Kevin G. Fair	Kelly Souders & Brian Peterson	September 25, 2009	3X5251	2.57
176	2	"Metallo"	Mairzee Almas	Don Whitehead & Holly Henderson	October 2, 2009	3X5252	2.24
177	3	"Rabid"	Michael Rohl	Jordan Hawley	October 9, 2009	3X5253	2.28
178	4	"Echo"	Wayne Rose	Bryan Miller	October 16, 2009	3X5254	2.59
179	5	"Roulette"	Kevin G. Fair	Genevieve Sparling	October 23, 2009	3X5256	2.47
180	6	"Crossfire"	Michael Rohl	Don Whitehead & Holly Henderson	October 30, 2009	3X5257	2.42
181	7	"Kandor"	Jeannot Szwarc	Al Septien & Turi Meyer	November 6, 2009	3X5258	2.63
182	8	"Idol"	Glen Winter	Anne Cofell Saunders	November 13, 2009	3X5255	2.68
183	9	"Pandora"	Morgan Beggs	Drew Landis & Julia Swift	November 20, 2009	3X5259	2.42
184	10	"Disciple"	Mairzee Almas	Jordan Hawley	January 29, 2010	3X5260	2.49
185	11 (Note: The writers consider "Absolute Justice" two separately produced episodes, but The CW broadcast them as a single episode, and later packaged it as a single episode in the season nine DVD. Therefore, "Absolute Justice" is both the 185th and 186th episode produced, but only the 185th episode aired.)	"Absolute Justice"	Glen Winter ("Society")	Geoff Johns	February 5, 2010	3X5261	2.77
185	11	"Absolute Justice"	Tom Welling ("Legends")	Geoff Johns	February 5, 2010	3X5262	2.77
186	12	"Warrior"	Allison Mack	Bryan Miller	February 12, 2010	3X5263	2.48
187	13	"Persuasion"	Christopher Petry	Anne Cofell Saunders	February 19, 2010	3X5265	2.44
188	14	"Conspiracy"	Turi Meyer	Al Septien & Turi Meyer	February 26, 2010	3X5264	2.54
189	15	"Escape"	Kevin G. Fair	Genevieve Sparling	April 2, 2010	3X5266	2.13
190	16	"Checkmate"	Tim Scanlan	John Chisholm	April 9, 2010	3X5267	1.99
191	17	"Upgrade"	Michael Rohl	Drew Landis & Julia Swift	April 16, 2010	3X5268	1.56
192	18	"Charade"	Brian Peterson	Don Whitehead & Holly Henderson	April 23, 2010	3X5269	2.05
193	19	"Sacrifice"	Kevin G. Fair	Story by : Justin Hartley & Walter Wong; Teleplay by : Justin Hartley & Walter Wong and Bryan Miller	April 30, 2010	3X5270	1.89
194	20	"Hostage"	Glen Winter	Jordan Hawley & Anne Cofell Saunders	May 7, 2010	3X5271	1.91
195	21	"Salvation"	Greg Beeman	Al Septien & Turi Meyer	May 14, 2010	3X5272	2.40

=== Season 10 (2010–11) ===
No. overall	No. in season	Title	Directed by	Written by	Original release date	Prod. code	U.S. viewers (millions)
196	1	"Lazarus"	Kevin G. Fair	Don Whitehead & Holly Henderson	September 24, 2010	3X6001	2.98
197	2	"Shield"	Glen Winter	Jordan Hawley	October 1, 2010	3X6002	2.38
198	3	"Supergirl"	Mairzee Almas	Anne Cofell Saunders	October 8, 2010	3X6003	2.30
199	4 (Note: The producers consider season nine's "Absolute Justice" two separately produced episodes, but The CW combined those two episodes into a single broadcast, and then packaged it in the season nine DVD as one episode as well. Therefore, "Absolute Justice" is both the 185th and 186th episode produced, but only the 185th episode aired. Thus, "Homecoming" is considered the 200th episode produced, but the 199th broadcast. The CW recognizes "Homecoming" to be the 200th episode.)	"Homecoming"	Jeannot Szwarc	Brian Peterson & Kelly Souders	October 15, 2010	3X6004	3.19
200	5	"Isis"	James Marshall	Genevieve Sparling	October 22, 2010	3X6005	2.60
201	6	"Harvest"	Turi Meyer	Al Septien & Turi Meyer	October 29, 2010	3X6007	2.96
202	7	"Ambush"	Christopher Petry	Don Whitehead & Holly Henderson	November 5, 2010	3X6006	2.63
203	8	"Abandoned"	Kevin G. Fair	Drew Landis & Julia Swift	November 12, 2010	3X6008	2.90
204	9	"Patriot"	Tom Welling	John Chisholm	November 19, 2010	3X6009	2.60
205	10	"Luthor"	Kelly Souders	Bryan Q. Miller	December 3, 2010	3X6010	2.76
206	11	"Icarus"	Mairzee Almas	Genevieve Sparling	December 10, 2010	3X6011	2.55
207	12	"Collateral"	Morgan Beggs	Jordan Hawley	February 4, 2011	3X6012	2.37
208	13	"Beacon"	Mike Rohl	Don Whitehead & Holly Henderson	February 11, 2011	3X6013	2.32
209	14	"Masquerade"	Tim Scanlan	Bryan Q. Miller	February 18, 2011	3X6014	2.22
210	15	"Fortune"	Christopher Petry	Anne Cofell Saunders	February 25, 2011	3X6015	2.56
211	16	"Scion"	Al Septien	Al Septien & Turi Meyer	March 4, 2011	3X6016	2.18
212	17	"Kent"	Jeannot Szwarc	Story by : Genevieve Sparling; Teleplay by : Brian Peterson & Kelly Souders	April 15, 2011	3X6018	2.37
213	18	"Booster"	Tom Welling	Geoff Johns	April 22, 2011	3X6017	2.35
214	19	"Dominion"	Justin Hartley	John Chisholm	April 29, 2011	3X6021	1.99
215	20	"Prophecy"	Mike Rohl	Bryan Q. Miller & Anne Cofell Saunders	May 6, 2011	3X6019	2.07
216	21	"Finale"	Kevin G. Fair	Al Septien & Turi Meyer	May 13, 2011	3X6020	3.02
217	22	"Finale"	Greg Beeman	Brian Peterson & Kelly Souders	May 13, 2011	3X6022	3.02

== Nielsen rankings ==
The following is a table for the seasonal rankings, based on average total estimated viewers per episode, of Smallville on the WB and The CW. "Rank" refers to how Smallville rated compared to the other television series which aired during primetime hours.

Viewership and ratings per season of Smallville
Season	Timeslot (ET)	Network	Episodes	First aired		Last aired		TV season	Viewership rank	Avg. viewers (millions)
Season	Timeslot (ET)	Network	Episodes	Date	Viewers (millions)	Date	Viewers (millions)	TV season	Viewership rank	Avg. viewers (millions)
1	Tuesday 9:00 pm	The WB	21	October 16, 2001	8.35	May 21, 2002	5.96	2001–02	115	5.90
2	Tuesday 9:00 pm	The WB	23	September 24, 2002	8.66	May 20, 2003	7.53	2002–03	113	6.30
3	Wednesday 8:00 pm	The WB	22	October 1, 2003	6.82	May 19, 2004	5.92	2003–04	141	4.96
4	Wednesday 8:00 pm	The WB	22	September 22, 2004	6.07	May 18, 2005	5.47	2004–05	124	4.40
5	Thursday 8:00 pm	The WB	22	September 29, 2005	5.90	May 11, 2006	4.85	2005–06	117	4.70
6	Thursday 8:00 pm	The CW	22	September 28, 2006	4.96	May 17, 2007	4.14	2006–07	125	4.10
7	Thursday 8:00 pm	The CW	20	September 27, 2007	5.18	May 15, 2008	3.85	2007–08	175	3.77
8	Thursday 8:00 pm	The CW	22	September 18, 2008	4.34	May 14, 2009	3.13	2008–09	152	3.74
9	Friday 8:00 pm	The CW	21	September 25, 2009	2.57	May 14, 2010	2.40	2009–10	129	2.38
10	Friday 8:00 pm	The CW	22	September 24, 2010	2.98	May 13, 2011	3.02	2010–11	202	3.19

== Home media ==
All ten seasons have been released on DVD in Regions 1, 2 and 4. Seasons five and six were also released in the now obsolete HD DVD format on November 28, 2006, and September 18, 2007, respectively. Seasons six, seven, eight, nine and ten have also been released on Blu-ray formats. The DVD releases include commentary by cast and crew members on selected episodes, deleted scenes, and behind-the-scenes featurettes. The promotional tie-ins, Chloe Chronicles and Vengeance Chronicles, accompanied the season two, three, and five box sets respectively. Other special features include interactive functionality such as a tour of Smallville, a comic book, and DVD-ROM material. The complete series box set includes additional special features never before released.

Complete season	DVD release dates			Blu-ray release dates	
Complete season	Region 1	Region 2	Region 4	Region A	Region B
1st	September 23, 2003	October 13, 2003	December 3, 2003	—N/a	
2nd	May 18, 2004	September 17, 2004	January 1, 2005	—N/a	
3rd	November 16, 2004	April 18, 2005	July 13, 2005	—N/a	
4th	September 13, 2005	October 10, 2005	November 11, 2006	—N/a	
5th	September 12, 2006	August 28, 2006	April 4, 2007	—N/a	
6th	September 18, 2007	October 22, 2007	March 5, 2008	September 18, 2007 (US); October 9, 2007 (CAN)	October 13, 2008 (UK); March 3, 2009 (AUS)
7th	September 9, 2008	October 13, 2008	March 3, 2009	September 9, 2008	October 13, 2008 (UK); March 3, 2009 (AUS)
8th	August 25, 2009	October 12, 2009	March 31, 2010	August 25, 2009	October 12, 2009 (UK); March 31, 2010 (AUS)
9th	September 7, 2010	October 25, 2010	March 2, 2011	September 7, 2010	October 25, 2010 (UK); March 1, 2011 (AUS)
10th	November 29, 2011	October 17, 2011	April 4, 2012	November 29, 2011	October 17, 2011 (UK); April 4, 2012 (AUS)
The Complete Series	November 29, 2011	October 17, 2011		October 19, 2021	
