= Batman 1 =

Batman 1 may refer to:

- Batman (serial), a 1943 film serial and the first Batman adaptation
- Batman (1966 film), the first Batman feature film
- Batman (1989 film), the first Batman film directed by Tim Burton
- Batman Begins, the first film in Christopher Nolan's The Dark Knight trilogy
- The Batman (film), the first Batman film directed by Matt Reeves
- The first issue of the Batman comic book
- Detective Comics #27, the 1939 comic debut of Batman
- Bruce Wayne, the first iteration of the DC Comics character Batman
- Batman: Year One, a 1984 comic book story arc written by Frank Miller
  - Batman: Year One (film), a 2011 animated film adaptation of the comic
- Batman: Earth One, a 2012–2021 graphic novel series written by Geoff Johns

== See also ==
- Batman (disambiguation)
- Batman 2 (disambiguation)
- Batman 3 (disambiguation)
