= Batman (manga) =

Batman, in manga, can refer to several different Batman manga series:

- Bat-Manga, a 1960s Batman manga by Jiro Kuwata
- Bat-Manga!: The Secret History of Batman in Japan a 2008 nonfiction history of Jiro Kuwata's Batman, by Chip Kidd.
- Batman: Child of Dreams, a 2000 Batman manga by Kia Asamiya
- Batman: Death Mask, a 2008 Batman manga by Yoshinori Natsume
- Batman and the Justice League, a 2018 Batman manga by Shiori Teshirogi
- Batman: Justice Buster, a 2023 Batman manga by Eiichi Shimizu & Tomohiro Shimoguchi

== See also ==
- Batman (disambiguation)
