= Bruce Wayne (TV series) =

Unproduced television series

Bruce Wayne was a planned television series focusing on a young Bruce Wayne before he became Batman. The idea was conceived as a pitch from screenwriter Tim McCanlies in late 1990s, and went as far into development until being shelved in favor of, at that time, the planned film Batman: Year One.

The concept would later be rethought and turned into the television series Smallville, this time focusing on a young Clark Kent before he became Superman. In addition, from 2014 until 2019, Fox aired Gotham, which focuses on a young Bruce Wayne and James Gordon, as well as the origin stories of several Batman villains such as Riddler, Penguin, Scarecrow, Poison Ivy, Catwoman, Two-Face and The Joker, among others.

== Background ==
In 1999, roughly a year after seeing the script he wrote for The Iron Giant get released, Tim McCanlies pitched to Tollin/Robbins Productions a 62-page pilot script for a TV show revolving around the teenage years of Bruce Wayne, the future Batman. The supporting characters included a grandfather-type, two-faced friends, a trustful cop, and an empire the hero would inherit. According to McCanlies, everyone knows the origin of Batman, but what was never answered in comics or any media were the questions of "why and how".

Tollin/Robbins bought the rights to produce the series, and while HBO began negotiating about possible broadcasting rights, The WB Television Network loved the idea and knew it would be the next big franchise on their network, to pair with the then-new Buffy the Vampire Slayer spin-off Angel. Since the series never actually reached pre-production or casting, it is unknown who would have starred in the show, but Shawn Ashmore, who later went on to play Bobby Drake in X-Men, X2, X-Men: The Last Stand and X-Men: Days of Future Past, was heavily rumored to be in negotiations about playing Bruce, as well as Trevor Fehrman of Clerks II fame. A then-unknown Michael Rosenbaum (who would go on to play Lex Luthor in Smallville) was considered to play the role of Harvey Dent. David Krumholtz, who went on to star in the TV show Numb3rs, was said to be rumored for Jim Gordon.

What led to the cancellation of the series altogether was the creative differences between Warner's TV division and film division. While the TV division liked the concept, the film division was more focused on getting the Batman film franchise back on track. Around the time development started on Bruce Wayne, Joel Schumacher, director of the critical flop Batman & Robin, pitched the idea for a serious Batman origin story using Frank Miller's Batman: Year One as a source. Eventually, WB's film division was moving forward with the concept, and in September 2000, Darren Aronofsky signed on to direct the film adaptation, with Miller as the screenwriter. It supposedly featured Aaron Eckhart (who would go on to play Harvey Dent in The Dark Knight) as Jim Gordon, and several actors, including Ben Affleck (who would go to play Batman in the DC Extended Universe), Brendan Fraser, Josh Hartnett, and Christian Bale (who would go to play Batman in The Dark Knight Trilogy), for the part of Batman. As the film division did not want to compete with a television series, the planned show was shelved.

== Pilot ==
The pilot is bookended by shots of a cavern, with Alfred Pennyworth as the narrator, telling all in flashback. Alfred bails soon to be 18-year-old Bruce Wayne from a London police station, after Bruce has gotten himself into another fight. Alfred informs Bruce that the trustees from his family's company need to see him, and though he'd rather stay where he is, Bruce nods when Alfred tells him he has no choice. After having a nightmare about his parents' murder, Bruce wakes up in his private jet and turns on the TV to see every show talking about him, including one hosted by Vicki Vale. Meanwhile, Alfred reads a book on troubled teens. Arriving in Gotham City, Bruce ponders why anyone would live in a city like this, as he points out running his company does not seem to be "part of the plan". After being mobbed by reporters, the two finally arrive at Wayne Manor where, after snapping at Alfred for bothering him because he got emotional from seeing his family portrait, Bruce heads out. With Alfred at his side, driving the Rolls-Royce, they arrive at the area now known as Crime Alley.

Bruce visits the very place where his parents were killed, where he opens up to Alfred, saying that it was his fault, all because he had to see Zorro, described by him as "a silly movie about a 'hero' who wears a costume and fights crime". Suddenly, thugs appear, and despite Alfred's pleas, Bruce fights the thugs. Using martial arts that he has learned, Bruce fights, disarms, and defeats the thugs. Bruce and Alfred drop the thugs off at Gotham PD, but their report is almost ignored until Bruce is recognized by a 13-year-old fan named Barbara Gordon. The two have a conversation, and Barbara introduces her father, someone Bruce already knows from when he was six: Detective James Gordon. Ignoring the board with notes and arrows pointing towards WayneCorp, he asks Gordon who killed his parents. Gordon shows Bruce the file on his parents, which is now a cold case because the killer was never caught. When asked about the thugs or even his family's company, Bruce just says he's leaving soon, because he wants nothing to do with Gotham City. As Bruce leaves, Gordon asks about Charles Palantine, whom he's meeting the next day. While he nods, he notices if Gordon's words are a warning.

Meeting Palantine the next day, Bruce asks about the investigation, and Palantine notes the police commissioner is a close personal friend. As Bruce is about to sign, because of the sight of Alfred and an old friend called Lucius Fox, he explains that he will look over the papers at his home. Now an intern, Fox reveals his father's "accidental" death, while Palantine reminds Bruce that he needs the papers signed first thing in the morning, for his 18th birthday is only two days away. Knowing the danger Bruce is now in, Alfred suggests a lawyer, and Bruce thinks of another old friend - Harvey Dent. Right in the middle of a costume party, Harvey welcomes Bruce back and says he will look at the papers. Bruce decides to stay at the party, even though he hates costumes, because he spots a stunning woman wearing a tiger costume: Selina Kyle. Bruce is pulled away from Harvey, who wants him to meet his sister. While waiting, Bruce talks to an attractive girl wearing an angel costume. When Selina and Harvey come into the room, Bruce learns the angel is Susan, Harvey's sister. Because Selina says she is "saving" Bruce from where he is, Susan leaves. Bruce becomes angry at Selina, so she leaves, too. Before he can do anything, Bruce is informed by Alfred that Gordon called for him at Wayne Chemical. Arriving there, and noticing the green pool of hazardous chemicals, Gordon and Bruce, only to learn neither one called the other, soon realize that it is a trap. The access hatch closes and locks, and water rushes in.

Working together, Gordon and Bruce find a tunnel 20 feet overhead, and using acrobatics, Bruce gets himself and Gordon to safety. Both agree that someone wants them dead. Nearby, Palantine watches. The next morning, Bruce and Gordon meet with Fox and his mother, talking about his late father, whom they described him as "nervous" just before he died. As Fox says he will check around, Bruce meets with Harvey, who demands that he does not sign the papers. While this happens, Harvey gets two phone calls from his mother and his father, with him playing both sides. All of a sudden, Harvey's mood swings and he tells Bruce to sign the papers. Bruce changes the subject and asks about Susan, and Harvey tells him the location of where she works. As they leave, two sedans come up behind the Rolls and open fire. A chase begins, and ends at where Susan works: the Gotham City Youth Shelter. Meeting Susan, Bruce apologizes and asks for a date, successfully getting back on her good side. Back at Wayne Manor, Bruce creates a ruse to explain why he did not turn in the papers yet. Just then, Gordon calls and tells him what Fox found: weekly shipments of hazardous waste. Bruce wants to meet, but Gordon tells Bruce to stay. Bruce gets an idea, alarming Alfred. Later, Bruce arrives at Wayne Chemical, dressed all in black, and follows Gordon, Rupert Montoya and Harvey Bullock. Suddenly, the three encounter the bad guys. Bruce helps, but stays out of sight the whole time. After defeating the last guy (with a banana peel), he and Alfred leave, with Bruce commenting that he may have found something he's good at. Bruce and Alfred meet with Gordon, learning the chemicals were drugs, and later hear that the head bad guy hanged himself. Later, Bruce is greeted by a surprise birthday party with Harvey and Susan, Selina, Billie and Lucius Fox, Jim and Barbara Gordon, Bullock, and Montoya. Harvey destroys the papers Bruce was told to sign, as he now owns WayneCorp. Palantine comes to the party, and tells Bruce that their stock might take a beating if word gets out about the drugs. He gives him a book, "Business for Beginners", and after he leaves, Bruce tells everyone that he has a lot to learn and he's staying in Gotham.

The final shot is back at the cavern which is revealed to be The Batcave as Alfred walks up the stairs to Wayne Manor.

== Series outline ==
Bruce Wayne was designed to run for five to six seasons, and a series bible was created despite the fact that development did not get far. The characters established in the pilot would have developed as the series progressed, eventually assuming their respective roles from the Batman mythos:

- Continuing from the pilot, Bruce Wayne would think that his family's company might not only be responsible for the decline of Gotham City and corruption within, but they may also be trying to kill him. A story arc would have been centred on crooked businessmen trying to take over Wayne Enterprises, and Bruce coming into conflict with the local mafia, led by Rupert Thorne and Carmine Falcone (later to be taken over by Oswald Cobblepot).
- Bruce's ally is Det. Gordon, who has his own enemies in the GCPD, led by Lt. Arnold Flass. Gordon's story arc would have revolved around his struggle with police corruption.
- Harvey Dent is Bruce Wayne's best friend, a few years older than him. Rich, spoiled, selfish, and shameless, Harvey's friendship with Bruce might lead him to take a different route later in life. Had the show been greenlit, Harvey's story would have been fleshed out: his abusive father, troubled childhood, struggles through law school, and subtle hints as to his development into Two-Face.
- Despite the character of Susan Dent in the pilot, Bruce was to have a number of romantic interests in the show's first season, including Barbara Gordon, young TV gossip reporter Vicki Vale, and a psychology student named Harleen Quinzel. These three would play important roles in Bruce's future.
- A few characters from the Batman mythos would have made appearances in either certain episodes or the entire show. Example of these characters include a mysterious "consultant" in Selina Kyle, a would-be comedian (described as "Sam Kinison but angrier") named Jack Napier, a psychology professor named Jonathan Crane, a disturbed con man called Edward Nygma, and even a strange kid from Smallville, Kansas. That strange kid, Clark Kent a.k.a. Superman, was going to appear in an episode that was planned, though it is unknown if it was to be in the first season or a later one (though interviews suggest it would have been in the first season). All that is known is that Bruce would have met Clark after he came to town for a WayneCorp-sponsored conference of high school journalists; Bruce would dismiss Clark at first as a nice kid from the sticks, before realizing that something is odd about this farm boy.
- As the series progressed, Bruce would become more fascinated by the criminal element, spending time at Arkham Asylum, restoring Wayne Manor, and bringing in a series of martial arts trainers. He would become more of a "night owl", as he notes he enjoys riding his motorcycle with the leather and helmet, which make him anonymous.
- It was planned to be towards the end of the first season that Bruce and Alfred find a cavern underneath Wayne Manor, which would become the future Batcave. This was incorporated into the TV series Gotham (2014-2019).
- In later seasons, it would be planned for Bruce to take bigger steps, such as joining the GCPD to be with Gordon, and even the FBI. These do not last, the reason being that Bruce "can't work within the system".
- While primarily set in Gotham, Bruce would have traveled abroad to China, Korea, France, and other parts of the world to learn defense attacks, criminology, detective skills, and manhunting; he would train with heroes such as Ted Grant and Richard Dragon, and villains like Slade Wilson and Ra's al Ghul, the latter of which was incorporated into Batman Begins.
- Bruce's skills would increase as the series progressed, perfecting his martial arts, car racing, helicopter and airplane flying, gymnastics, and much more. While the world thinks he's a rich kid living it up, it is actually work for a bigger purpose.
- Once Bruce gains control of WayneCorp, he uses the companies' resources to help him in his cause. This would include R&D in special weapons, prototypes, and vehicles that all disappear and end up as part of Batman's arsenal. This is mirrored in the later film, Batman Begins. WayneCorp would win the bid to build the FBI's computer criminal database, to which Bruce would have access.
- Like the pilot, each episode would be framed with bookend scenes of an older Alfred telling the tale through his "memoirs".
- Although it is unknown if the scene was to be in the study with a crashing bat like the classic comics, the series finale would have been about Bruce figuring out the best way to stop the criminal element in Gotham City, by becoming a bat.

== Reviews of the pilot script ==
After news broke that the proposed show was cancelled, the pilot script was leaked and reviewed on the Internet. Regardless of the news, or even the release of Batman Begins in 2005, reviewers reacted positively to the script. Back in 2000, IGN reviewed the script, stating that while the writing needed some fine-tuning, such as the predictable plot, trimming some scenes, and improving the action sequences, it was still a "good launching pad for a TV series". The reviewer noticed certain things in the script, like the character of Charles Palantine, named after the senator from the film Taxi Driver, the film that also influenced the look of Batman: Year One. Another note was the easter egg cameos of Barbara Gordon and Selina Kyle, which were both entertaining and useful to moving the story forward.

In terms of characters, reviewers favored the pilot's incarnation of Alfred, saying that the character was more of a surrogate father than just a manservant, as well as liking the little hints of Alfred's secret background, working as an actor, combat medic, and secret agent. Overall, the script's Alfred "perfectly captured the butler's droll wit and nagging manner...with a series of memorable verbal jabs". While characters like Gordon, Harvey, and Selina remained true to their comic book counterparts, their histories were altered for the context of the show. The reviewer saw the pilot's weakest character in Charles Palantine, who represented, in the reviewer's mind, an uninspired corporate bad guy, even though the show had to be grounded in reality before featuring a more colourful gallery of rogues.

The reviewer at IGN also had a comment about the show's main character, Bruce Wayne. Although the show's take on the character was better, in his opinion, than the first four Batman films (because Bruce is at first sulky, rebellious, curious, and wistful), the character seemed more akin to Robin and Spider-Man than Batman himself. As noted in the review:

Yes, Bruce is supposed to be a teen here and not the hard-bitten old crime fighter he's destined to become. It's just that I saw no clear indication in this story that he would become such a dark figure. True, this was just the pilot so Bruce should, like Anakin Skywalker, grow more somber and imposing as the series progresses. But by beginning the TV series like this, Bruce's gloomy transformation must eventually be explained. The series must show what future tragedies or hardships befall Bruce that make him lose his sense of humor and his innocence, and that ultimately make him so obsessed with vengeance that his only recourse is to don a bizarre disguise and fight a one-man war on crime. Also, by focusing solely on Bruce Wayne and not Batman doesn't this series then conflict with the widely held belief amongst comic fans that "Bruce Wayne" is the disguise and "Batman" is his true identity?

Regardless, many reviewers saw Bruce Wayne as "an entertaining take on the Batman legend while only subtly suggesting the Dark Knight".

== Development into Smallville ==
After the show got shelved, Tollin/Robbins approached Peter Roth, the President of Warner Bros. Television, about developing a series based on a young Superman back in the year 2000. That same year, Alfred Gough and Miles Millar developed a pilot based on the film Eraser. After watching the pilot, Roth approached the two men about developing a second pilot based on the young Superman concept that was brought to him. After meeting with Roth, Gough and Millar decided that they did not want to do a series where there was a cape and much flying. It was here that they developed a "no tights, no flights" rule, vowing Clark would not fly or don the suit at any point during the show. This was similar to the plans for Bruce Wayne, where the character was not going to be seen wearing the Batman costume during the entire run of the planned series.

After the success of Smallville, attempts and pitches were made by Gough and Millar to do Bruce Wayne as a companion show. Their attempts were denied, and instead a Batman-like show came in the form of Birds of Prey. After the film version of Batman: Year One got shelved, the concept of an origin film of how Bruce Wayne became Batman would finally see the light of day in the form of Batman Begins, by director Christopher Nolan and writer David S. Goyer.
