= Batman, Iran =

Batman باتمان
- Village
- Location within Iran
- Coordinates: 34°45′03″N 46°57′15″E
- Country: Iran
- Province: Kermanshah
- County: Kermanshah
- Bakhsh: Central
- Rural District: Razavar

Population (2006)
  - Total: 450
- Time zone: UTC+3:30 (IRST)
  - Summer (DST): UTC+4:30 (IRDT)
- ISO 3166 code: IRN

Batman (Persian: باتمان, also Romanized as Bātmān) is a village in Razavar Rural District, in the Central District of Kermanshah County, Kermanshah Province, Iran.

== Geography ==
The centre of Batman is located at a latitude of 34.7508 and longitude of 46.9542. The village has an elevation of 1481 meters above sea level.

== Culture ==
The major languages spoken in this area are Kurdish.

== Demographics ==
At the 2006 census, its population was 450, in 117 families.
