= Batman (disambiguation) =

Batman is a superhero appearing in American comic books published by DC Comics.

Batman or The Batman may also refer to:

== Art, entertainment, and media ==
=== Characters ===
- Batman (Terry McGinnis)
- Batman (Thomas Wayne)
- Batman (Earth-Two)
- Batman of Zur-En-Arrh
- Batman (Gotham television series character)
- Batman (DC Extended Universe character)
- Batman (Dark Knight trilogy character)
- Batman (1989 film series character)
- Batman (Jace Fox)

=== Literature ===
- Batman (comic book), published from 1940 to the present, focusing on the mainstream version of the character
- Batman (comic strip), in newspapers from 1943 to 1991
- Batman (manga), several comic series published in Japan

=== Films ===
- Batman (1966 film), based on the 1966 television series
- Batman (1989 film)
- The Batman (film), 2022
- Batman (serial), a 1943 film serial

=== Television ===
- Batman (TV series), 1966–1968 series
- The Adventures of Batman, a 1968–1969 animated series (aka: The Batman/Superman Hour and Batman with Robin the Boy Wonder)
- Batman: The Animated Series, a 1992–1995 animated series
- The Batman (TV series), a 2000s animated series
- Batman: The Brave and the Bold, a 2008–2011 animated series
- Batman: Caped Crusader, a 2024 animated series

=== Video games ===
- Batman (1986 video game), for Amstrad CPC, MSX, and ZX Spectrum
- Batman (1989 video game), for Amiga, Amstrad CPC, Atari ST, Commodore 64, MS-DOS, MSX, and ZX Spectrum
- Batman: The Video Game, released in 1989 for NES and Game Boy
- Batman (Sega Genesis video game), released in 1990
- Batman (1991 video game), released by Atari
- Batman (2013 arcade game), released by Raw Thrills
- Batman: The Telltale Series, released by Telltale Games in 2016
  - Batman: The Enemy Within, the sequel released by Telltale Games in 2017
- Batman: Arkham, 2009–2024 video game series developed by Rocksteady Studios

=== Role-playing games ===
- Batman Role-Playing Game, published in 1989

=== Music ===
- "Batman Theme", by Neal Hefti for the 1960s television show, and recorded by many artists since
  - "Batman!" (Jan and Dean song), based on the theme by Neal Hefti
- Batman (album), by Prince
- Batman (score), the film score by Danny Elfman for the 1989 film
  - "The Batman Theme", theme to the 1989 film, appearing on Batman (score)
- "Batman", a 2017 song by Jaden Smith from the album Syre
- The Batman (soundtrack), the film score by Michael Giacchino for the 2022 film
  - "The Batman", theme to the 2022 film, appearing on The Batman (soundtrack)

=== Toy line ===
- Batman (2003 toy line), six-inch model figures

== Places ==
=== Australia ===
- Division of Batman, a former electoral district in Melbourne, Victoria, named after one of the city's founders, John Batman
  - Batman railway station

=== Iran ===
- Batman, Iran, a village in Kermanshah Province

=== Turkey ===
- Batman, Turkey, a city in the Southeastern Anatolia Region
  - Batman Province
  - Batman District
  - Batman, Tunceli
  - Batman (electoral district)
  - Batman River
  - Batman University

== People ==
- Batman (surname), including a list of people with the name

=== As nickname or stage name ===
- Antonis Fotsis (born 1981), Greek basketball player also known as Batman
- Haim Gozali (born 1973), Israeli mixed martial artist also known as Batman
- Marques Houston (born 1981), American entertainer also known as Batman
- Bershawn Jackson (born 1983), American athlete also known as Batman
- The Batman rapist, a UK murderer and rapist

== Other uses ==
- Batman (military), a soldier assigned as a personal valet to a commissioned officer
- Batman (truck), a monster truck that debuted in 2006
- Batman (unit), a historical unit of measure
- Batman: The Ride, a steel inverted roller coaster
- B.A.T.M.A.N., a mesh network routing protocol
- Bayesian tool for methylation analysis, also known as BATMAN
- Batman's Treaty, a historical Australian treaty
- Batman, a junior synonym of the fish genus Cryptocentrus

== See also ==
- Man-Bat, a DC Comics character
- List of DC Comics characters named Batman, other superheroes who adopted the identity
- Batman franchise media, for the DC Comics franchise
- Batman and Robin
- Batman's Treaty, a treaty between John Batman and a group of Wurundjeri elders for the rental of Aboriginal lands
- Bathmen, a municipality in the Netherlands
- Batsman, in stick-and-ball sports
- Battman (Tony Silipini, 1931–2021), American wrestler
- Batman 1 (disambiguation)
- Batman 2 (disambiguation)
- Batman 3 (disambiguation)
- Batter (disambiguation)
- Bruce Wayne (disambiguation)
- Vampire (disambiguation)
