= Pilot (The 4400) =

- The 4400 episodes
- Episode nos.: Season 1 Episodes 1 and 2
- Directed by: Yves Simoneau
- Written by: Scott Peters; René Echevarria
- Original air date: July 11, 2004

Guest appearances
- Michael Moriarty - Orson Bailey; Conchita Campbell - Maia Rutledge; Genevieve Buechner - Heidi Moore; Andrew Airlie - Brian Moore; Lori Triolo - Linda; Chilton Crane - Susan Farrell; Garwin Sanford - Adam Kensington; Sheila Patterson - Elizabeth Bailey; Jason Low - Sid Stradner; Terry Chen - Colin Chen; Jesse Hutch - Brad Rossi; Ross Douglas - Gregory Kensington; Patti Allan - Barbara Yates; Roger Haskett - Mr. Rutledge; Carrie Fleming - Mrs. Rutledge; Eric Breker - Kenneth Griffin; Eileen Pride - Patty Griffin; Adrian Holmes - Lt. Payton; Keith Martin Gordey - Alan Kushner; Karin Konoval - Dr. Emily Sanford; Pamela Hart - Lawyer; Link Baker - Air Force officer

Episode chronology
← Previous —	Next → "The New and Improved Carl Morrissey"

"Pilot" is the first episode of season one and the pilot of the science fiction television series The 4400. The episode aired July 11, 2004 on the USA Network. The episode was written by Scott Peters and René Echevarria, and was directed by Yves Simoneau. Attracting approximately 7.4 million viewers, the episode became basic cable's most watched première since The Dead Zone. "Pilot" introduces the show's premise of 4400 people being abducted in the past, beginning from 1946, and all being returned to the present day in a flash of light at Highland Beach.

A comet suddenly changes trajectory and is heading towards Earth, apparently coming in for a "landing", 4400 people assumed dead or missing reappear. When 4400s begin to exhibit "abilities" Tom Baldwin and Diana Skouris are partnered to investigate them.

== Plot ==
The episode begins on March 3, 1946. A young girl, Maia Rutledge (Conchita Campbell) of Crescent City, California, is with her parents in their car. Although it is raining outside, she persuades her parents to let her play nearby. While she is collecting flowers in the bushes, a light shines down on Maia, and she disappears. The next scene takes place on May 11, 1951 in South Korea. A young black soldier, Richard Tyler (Mahershalalhashbaz Ali), is being beaten by his fellow officers. One of them remarks, "We treated you like an equal, but that wasn't good enough for you. You had to cross the line." A fellow soldier then drops a photo booth strip on the floor; the pictures are of Richard with a young white woman. Moments later, the same light which abducted Maia shines on Richard, and he vanishes.

In 1979, Orson Bailey (Michael Moriarty), a partner at an insurance firm, is preparing to leave his office to take his wife on a date. As he approaches his car, the light appears and he vanishes as well. Next, teenage cousins Shawn Farrell (Patrick Flueger) and Kyle Baldwin (Chad Faust) are on a beach at night in the year 2001, drinking beers and talking about their personal lives. The light shines on them, and Kyle drops to the ground, alone and unconscious. The episode jumps to the present day with Kyle in a hospital bed, hooked up to a respirator. His father, Tom Baldwin (Joel Gretsch), is comforting him.

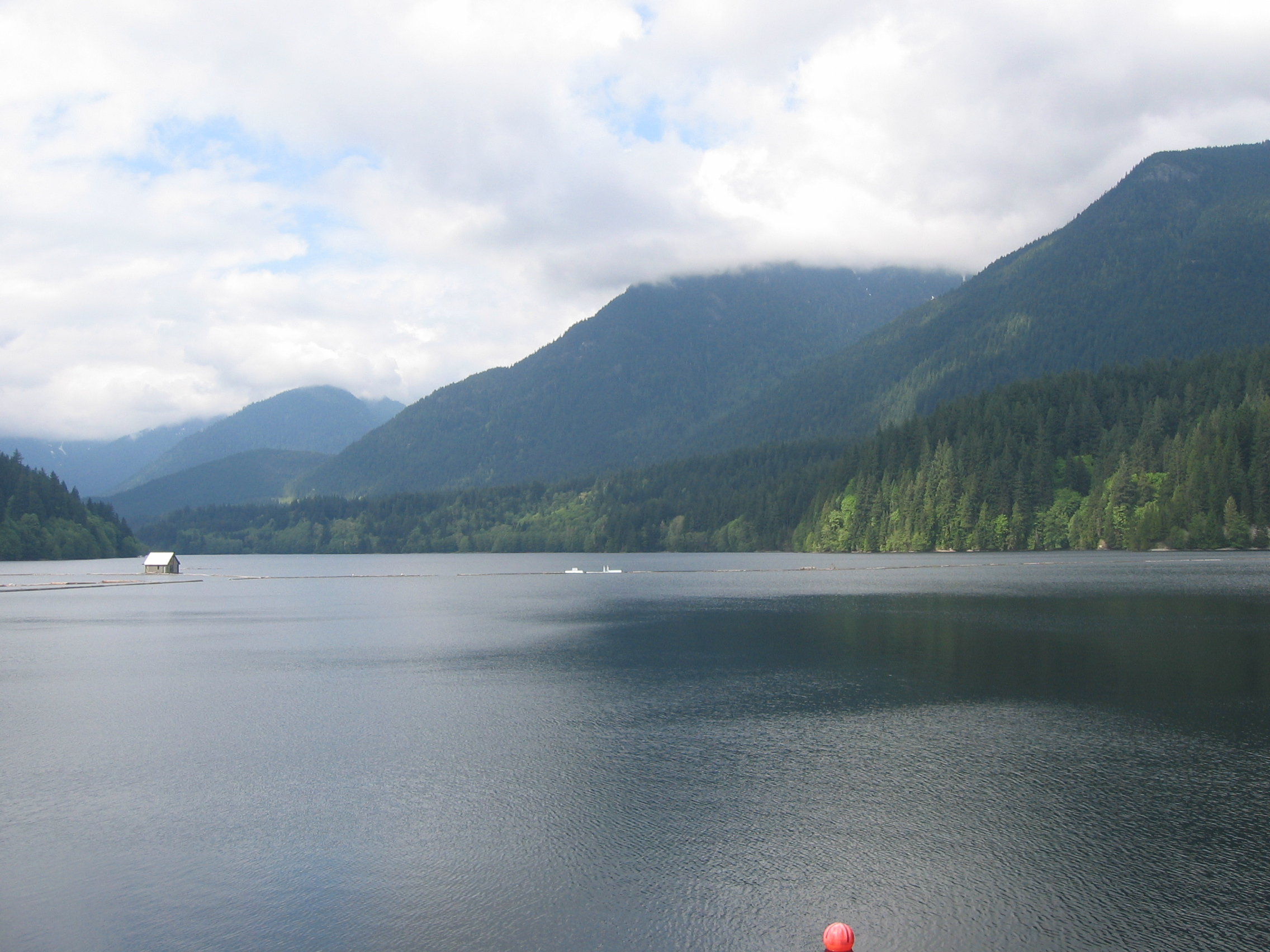
Capilano Lake portrays Highland Beach

Elsewhere, Diana Skouris (Jacqueline McKenzie) receives a call on her cell from Dennis Ryland (Peter Coyote) telling her to "Get over here, now!" As Diana arrives at NTAC, Ryland announces that the country is at DEFCON One. Diana asks to be brought up to speed, and an unnamed co-worker tells her that the comet is no longer a fly-by; it is heading toward the earth. Countries around the world begin deploying missiles in an attempt to destroy the comet.

As it enters the atmosphere of Earth, Diana remarks that the comet is slowing down, "as if it's coming in for a landing." As she tells Ryland the co-ordinates of where the comet's trajectory will land it, Dennis states that it is near Mount Rainier, their "back yard." Arriving at the landing spot of the comet, a multitude of cameramen and reporters have set up. Diana looks on as the comet slowly comes in to land, hovering over a lake and causing ripples to form in the water. While emitting a sound, the comet begins to shrivel and lose its cohesion. Seconds later, the ball of light explodes, sending a shock-wave that knocks over the onlookers. Returning to their feet, they discover the comet is gone, and thousands of people have appeared.

Back at NTAC, Tom and Dennis argue in Dennis' office. Tom tells him he needs answers, and that he will come through for Dennis. After this Dennis introduces Tom to Diana, explaining how, together, they will make a good team investigating the return of the 4400.

The 4400 are quarantined at a Homeland Security facility where they are questioned. Tom meets with Shawn and questions him, expressing frustration when Shawn indicates that he does not remember anything. Orson becomes angry when inquiring about his release, causing a nose bleed. Richard meets Lily (Laura Allen), and finds out that she is the granddaughter of his former girlfriend, who has since died.

The ACLU successfully sues for the release of the 4400. Homeland Security provides them with temporary living expenses, and many are reunited with family.

Richard travels to St. Louis only to discover that his old neighborhood has been demolished and replaced with a highway. Orson visits his wife, who is now elderly and in a dilapidated nursing home, before visiting his insurance firm to get his old job back. The CEO is the son of Orson's former partner, and welcomes him back, but informs him that there are no available positions, and that his partnership was paid out to his wife when he was declared dead. Orson becomes visibly angry and smashes a glass in his hand. Later that night Orson takes a taxi to the CEO's house where he rings the buzzer at the gate and becomes agitated when it is not answered. He rattles the gate and yells, and as he becomes more agitated, glass shatters in the house and the CEO clutches his head before collapsing onto his coffee table where he is impaled through the chest with one of the legs.

After her husband did not show up to pick her up, Lily goes to her old house. Her daughter, who was six months old when she disappeared, answers the door and does not recognize her. Her former husband comes to the door and informs her that he is remarried and that she would not fit in with his new family. She walks away stunned.

Shawn returns home to a party. He and his brother are now the same age. He goes outside to catch a breather and Tom follows him. While outside a bird flies into the window and appears to die of a broken neck. Shawn picks up the bird, and while talking to Tom, the bird returns to life and flies away. At the end of the party, Shawn finds his car vandalized with the words "freak" spray-painted on it.

Maia remains at the holding facility, having no living family. However, she understands this and acts calm. Eventually, she is adopted by foster parents. The foster parents take her home where they are startled by her seeming ability to predict the future.

In the second half of the pilot, Maia's foster parents take her to visit the cemetery where her parents are buried. When they comment that the cemetery is not very well maintained, Maia tells them that they will be buried at a nicer cemetery. When they receive a brochure for the cemetery that Maia mentioned in the mail, they become shaken. They return her to the facility, which she understands. The mother warns her that she scares people by some of the things she says. Dennis attempts to question her on why she was returned, but she does not give him any specific answers, seeming to take her foster mother's warning to heart.

Shawn returns to school where he struggles to fit in now that four years have passed. He is confronted by a boy to whom he sold fake concert tickets before his disappearance. After school, they get into a fist fight where Shawn appears to have superior physical strength and dexterity and seems to pull life from the boy. He is removed from the fight before serious damage is done, but the fight is witnessed by many people. His brother's girlfriend Nikki takes a special interest in his well being, providing him with comforting words and a burned CD of modern music that he can listen to in order to catch up with pop culture.

Meanwhile, Tom and Diana are informed that Orson is being held by the Seattle police department in connection with the murder of the CEO. Seattle PD tell them that they cannot charge him, as the security footage clearly shows that he never went inside the house. However, Tom notices the glass flying in the footage. Tom and Diana question Orson, and he becomes slightly agitated. The room shakes, the coffee pots crack, and Orson's nose starts bleeding. However he realizes what is going on and calms down before anything serious happens. After not giving much information, he is released. He goes to the nursing home only to be informed that while he was being held, his wife died. He becomes angry, and the manager tries to restrain him. The building shakes, lights shatter and medical devices start flying around the room, with multiple nurses and orderlies witnessing. Orson then gets up and runs out.

Tom and Diana visit the nursing home to get the details and warn the manager not to inform the press. They trace Orson to his lake cabin 70 miles away. They confront him there, and he asks to be left alone so he won't hurt anyone else. When they refuse, he again becomes agitated, causing the building to shake, objects to fly and nose and ear bleeds in himself, Diana and Tom. This time he can't seem to stop it, so Diana shoots him in the shoulder, at which point everything stops. He is taken to a hospital, but refuses to communicate any more.

Lily meets with a doctor and finds out she is pregnant. She meets with her former husband who reminds her that he was out of town for an extended period of time around her disappearance, and says that the child could not be his. She states that she was never with anyone else. He also presents Lily with a restraining order commanding her to stay away from his family and their daughter. Distraught, Lily is next seen at a park. Meanwhile, Richard returns to Seattle and tracks her down. They embrace and decide to support each other, as the connection between Richard and Lily's grandmother has drawn them closer.

Meanwhile, websites start popping up with conspiracies about the 4400, including one regarding Orson. Shawn walks in while his brother and his girlfriend are viewing this website. Shawn is also confronted by his brother regarding the fight, and claims he has no idea what he's talking about. However, he visits his cousin in the hospital and briefly wakes him from his coma by grabbing on to him, thus realizing that he has some sort of supernatural ability.

== Production ==
Scott Peters, creator of The 4400, stated that The 4400 was loosely inspired by the events of 9/11. Originally "Pilot" was scripted to be a one-hour pilot for the FOX network; however, the FOX network passed on the show due to interest only in a miniseries while producer Maira Suro believed the show had "legs" for a full series. The FOX network then allowed Peters and American Zoetrope to "take" the show with them. The USA Network was approached with the series, and after reading the script, the show was greenlit for a two-hour pilot episode. According to Peters, the USA Network did not wish to change the show or cut any characters from the script.

In an interview with writer and executive producer, Ira Steven Behr, he notes that there are no religious aspects to the episode and that he does not believe religion will play any major part in the first season, stating "I have my beliefs, and you have yours".

== Reception ==
"Pilot" became basic cable's most watched première, supplanting the pilot episode of The Dead Zone. The episode was also nominated for two Emmy Awards in the 57th Annual Primetime Emmy Awards, nominated for Outstanding Writing for a Miniseries, Movie, or Dramatic Special and the award for Outstanding Cinematography for a Miniseries or Movie. The episode did not receive any awards.

Sci Fi television critic Kathie Huddleston rated the episode as a "B", stating "The 4400 feels more like a drama than a science-fiction show. When the sci-fi elements do come into play, they're often subtle." While IGN reviewer "KJB" rated the episode as a "six out of ten" and states in regards to the characters "What remains to be seen is if the major characters can get beyond their obvious roots in other series and make viewers forget their slightly more than passing resemblance to Mulder & Scully."
