= List of The 4400 episodes =

The 4400 is a science fiction television series produced by CBS Paramount Network Television in association with Sky Television, Renegade 83 and American Zoetrope for USA Network in the United States and Sky One in the United Kingdom. The show was created and written by Scott Peters and René Echevarria, and it stars Joel Gretsch and Jacqueline McKenzie. The series ran for four seasons from 2004 until its cancellation in 2007. During the course of the series, 44 episodes of The 4400 aired over four seasons.

In the pilot episode, what was originally thought to be a comet deposits a group of exactly 4400 people at Highland Beach, in the Cascade Range foothills near Mount Rainier, Washington. Each of the 4400 had disappeared at various times starting from 1946 in a beam of white light. None of the 4400 have aged from the time of their disappearance. Confused and disoriented, they remember nothing of events occurring between the time of their disappearance and their return.

== Series overview ==
Season	Episodes	Originally released	
Season	Episodes	First released	Last released
1	5	July 11, 2004	August 8, 2004
2	13	June 5, 2005	August 28, 2005
3	13	June 11, 2006	August 27, 2006
4	13	June 17, 2007	September 16, 2007

== Episodes ==
=== Season 1 (2004) ===
No. overall	No. in season	Title	Directed by	Written by	Original release date	U.S. viewers (millions)
1	1	"Pilot"	Yves Simoneau	Scott Peters & René Echevarria	July 11, 2004	7.41
A comet's path changes course towards Earth when suddenly it comes in for a "landing". 4400 people, assumed to be dead or missing over the past 58 years, reappear and none have aged a day or have any memories since disappearing.
2	2	"The New and Improved Carl Morrissey"	Helen Shaver	Ira Steven Behr	July 18, 2004	5.63
Tom and Diana investigate Carl Morrissey, a 4400, who is using his ability of enhanced reflexes and strength to fight crime single-handedly. Lily is arrested when she attempts to see her daughter. Diana takes Maia home with her from quarantine.
3	3	"Becoming"	David Straiton	Craig Sweeny	July 25, 2004	5.49
Tom and Diana are tasked with investigating Oliver Knox, a serial killer who was never caught and is using his ability of suggestion to make men think they are the ones who committed his past crimes so that they will murder women. A list of 4400s is leaked to the public. Kyle awakens from his coma after Shawn uses his ability on him.
4	4	"Trial By Fire"	Nick Gomez	Robert Hewitt Wolfe	August 1, 2004	5.01
Several 4400s are killed during anti-4400 terrorist bombings, Tom and Diana must race to stop the perpetrators. Kyle begins to exhibit strange behavior and begins to understand what is wrong with him.
5	5	"White Light"	Tim Hunter	Scott Peters	August 8, 2004	6.13
Tom and Diana break Kyle out of NTAC quarantine and head to Highland Beach. In a virtual reality with Kyle, Tom learns where the 4400 were taken, who took them, and why.

=== Season 2 (2005) ===
No. overall	No. in season	Title	Directed by	Written by	Original release date	U.S. viewers (millions)
6	1	"Wake Up Call"	Leslie Libman	Ira Steven Behr & Craig Sweeny	June 5, 2005	5.25
7	2	"Wake Up Call"	Leslie Libman	Ira Steven Behr & Craig Sweeny	June 5, 2005	5.25
Tom and Diana investigate a mysterious structure which is being built at a psychiatric hospital, based on the drawings of a schizophrenic 4400, Tess Doerner. Richard must protect his family when he and Lily are discovered to be 4400s. This is a two-part episode.
8	3	"Voices Carry"	Vincent Misiano	Lisa Melamed	June 12, 2005	4.38
A returnee exhibiting telepathic abilities seeks help from NTAC, but is instead used as a mole to infiltrate Jordan Collier's 4400 Center. Kyle prepares to enter into college but discovers his father has not paid his tuition fees. Lily steals money from a hotel cash register.
9	4	"Weight of the World"	Oz Scott	Scott Peters	June 19, 2005	4.03
Tom and Diana investigate a 4400 whose ability to accelerate the human body's metabolism just may be the perfect weight loss drug.
10	5	"Suffer the Children"	Vincent Misiano	Frederick Rappaport	June 26, 2005	4.12
Tom and Diana investigate a 4400 junior high school teacher accused of child abuse.
11	6	"As Fate Would Have It"	Nick Gomez	Craig Sweeny	July 10, 2005	3.20
A morbid premonition from Maia threatens the future of the 4400 Center.
12	7	"Life Interrupted"	Michael W. Watkins	Ira Steven Behr	July 17, 2005	N/A
Tom finds himself in a world where the 4400 abductions never happened.
13	8	"Carrier"	Leslie Libman	Douglas Petrie	July 24, 2005	N/A
A 4400, whose ability has turned her into a walking plague, believes she is the next messiah.
14	9	"Rebirth"	Milan Cheylov	Lisa Melamed	July 31, 2005	3.50
Tom and Diana investigate a 4400 with the ability to repair defects in fetuses.
15	10	"Hidden"	Vincent Misiano	Frederick Rappaport	August 7, 2005	3.49
NTAC and Tom enter a race against time as they both draw closer to Jordan Collier's assassin.
16	11	"Lockdown"	Douglas Petrie	Douglas Petrie	August 14, 2005	3.40
NTAC goes into an emergency lockdown when a 4400 launches a terrorist attack.
17	12	"The Fifth Page"	Scott Peters	Ira Steven Behr & Craig Sweeny	August 21, 2005	3.90
4400s across the globe are developing strange, severe illnesses, leading Tom and Diana into the heart of a terrifying conspiracy.
18	13	"Mommy's Bosses"	John Behring	Ira Steven Behr & Craig Sweeny	August 28, 2005	3.70
Tom and Diana discover the source of the plague afflicting the 4400—a discovery that will change their lives.

=== Season 3 (2006) ===
No. overall	No. in season	Title	Directed by	Written by	Original release date
19	1	"The New World"	Vincent Misiano	Ira Steven Behr & Frederick Rappaport	June 11, 2006
20	2	"The New World"	Vincent Misiano	Ira Steven Behr & Frederick Rappaport	June 11, 2006
Richard has to cope with two horrendous changes in his life after he discovers that Isabelle and Lily have both aged substantially. The Nova Group reveals itself as a group of 4400s who have the power to influence the world. This is a two-part episode.
21	3	"Being Tom Baldwin"	Colin Bucksey	Shintaro Shimosawa & James Morris	June 18, 2006
Tom is charged with a crime he does not remember committing, and Shawn helps Isabelle through her growing pains.
22	4	"Gone (part one)"	Morgan Beggs	Bruce Miller	June 25, 2006
Someone is targeting young 4400s and Maia gets kidnapped. Shawn receives a threat from the Nova Group.
23	5	"Gone (part two)"	Morgan Beggs & Scott Peters	Bruce Miller & Darcy Meyers	July 2, 2006
Tom and Alana experience visions of Maia, whom they have no memories of. When Diana's life is put in danger, Tom makes a grim bargain to bring back the children.
24	6	"Graduation Day"	Aaron Lipstadt	Craig Sweeny	July 9, 2006
After Shawn is attacked, Isabelle seeks revenge on the Nova Group. Tom hesitates to kill Isabelle.
25	7	"The Home Front"	Nick Copus	Craig Sweeny & Ira Steven Behr	July 16, 2006
Tom and Diana continue the hunt for terrorists, while Dennis Ryland finds one in an unlikely place. Nikki pays Shawn a visit.
26	8	"Blink"	Colin Bucksey	Amy Berg & Andrew Colville	July 23, 2006
Exposure to a new 4400 ability causes Tom and Diana to have hallucinations of loved ones from their past. Isabelle decides she wants Shawn to marry her, no matter what.
27	9	"The Ballad of Kevin and Tess"	Scott Peters	Ira Steven Behr & Craig Sweeny	July 30, 2006
Kevin is on the run after horribly mutating due to the promicin experiments. Tom and Diana go to Tess for help. Diana gets what she believes is the flu and discovers something startling.
28	10	"The Starzl Mutation"	Allison Liddi	Amy Berg & Craig Sweeny	August 6, 2006
A former Army Ranger who was recruited for a secret government program contacts NTAC when an experiment giving him and others 4400 abilities goes wrong, causing one patient to go on a killing spree.
29	11	"The Gospel According to Collier"	Frederick E.O. Toye	Story by : Adam Levy; Teleplay by : Ira Steven Behr & Craig Sweeny	August 13, 2006
Tom and Diana discover that Jordan Collier has been spotted, and try to track him down. Kyle gets a surprising visitor in prison.
30	12	"Terrible Swift Sword"	Scott Peters	Bruce Miller & Ira Steven Behr	August 20, 2006
Jordan goes public about his "resurrection", and summons a 4400 with a tracking ability to find Kevin and Tess, who are still at large.
31	13	"Fifty–Fifty"	Nick Copus	Ira Steven Behr & Craig Sweeny	August 27, 2006
Diana pulls Maia out of the 4400 Center school. Collier's promicin distribution begins. Isabelle and Haspel Corporation part ways. Shawn and Isabelle are seriously injured. Alana is abducted again.

=== Season 4 (2007) ===
No. overall	No. in season	Title	Directed by	Written by	Original release date
32	1	"The Wrath of Graham"	Ernest Dickerson	Ira Steven Behr & Craig Sweeny	June 17, 2007
A new director takes over NTAC, while a high-school student develops an ability after taking promicin.
33	2	"Fear Itself"	Nick Copus	Amy Berg & Andrew Colville	June 24, 2007
Kyle receives a lead from Cassie, leading to a book containing a prophecy about Jordan Collier.
34	3	"Audrey Parker's Come and Gone"	Colin Bucksey	Nick Wauters	July 1, 2007
A woman can project herself astrally, remaining unseen, but her body is murdered during astral projection. She must find a way to contact Tom and Diana to catch her murderer.
35	4	"The Truth and Nothing But the Truth"	Scott Peters	Mark Kruger	July 8, 2007
Diana finds April, whose life is in danger because of promicin.
36	5	"Try the Pie"	Craig Ross, Jr.	Michael Narducci	July 15, 2007
Tom locates Jordan Collier, who is living in a small town. Meanwhile, Maia has a shocking vision of the future.
37	6	"The Marked"	Leslie Libman	Craig Sweeny	July 22, 2007
A 4400, Curtis Peck promises to expose ten agents from the future (the Marked, noted for their X-shaped mark behind the left ear) who have taken over the bodies of prominent people in the present day. Each of the Marked are allied to the faction in the future that are opposed to the 4400, and are trapped in the past in an attempt to complete their mission: the destruction of Jordan Collier and negation of the 4400's effect on the timeline. Before being compromised, Curtis Peck is only able to name one of the ten, the CEO of Ubient Software. Tom is taken and seemingly operated on, resulting in a mark behind his left ear. The only revealed Marked meets with Tom and Diana, seemingly to feel out an alliance.
38	7	"Till We Have Built Jerusalem"	Scott Peters	Robert Hewitt Wolfe	July 29, 2007
Shawn Farrell's political ambitions are threatened by a woman who claims he healed her mother in return for sex. At the same time, Jordan Collier annexes part of Seattle itself and calls it "Promise City", threatening to retaliate if opposed.
39	8	"No Exit"	Tony Westman	Adam Levy	August 5, 2007
Opposing sides all wake up inside NTAC without any memory of how they got there. A lockdown at NTAC traps everyone, including Collier and his group, and everyone must put aside their differences and work together in order to find a way out.
40	9	"Daddy's Little Girl"	Nick Copus	Ira Steven Behr & Amy Berg	August 12, 2007
Richard surprises Isabelle when he shows up in Promise City ... but the happy reunion takes a turn when Richard kidnaps her in hopes of starting a new life with his daughter. Meanwhile, Tess, her schizophrenia out of control, uses her ability to take control of people at a diner, forcing Kevin to call Shawn for help.
41	10	"One of Us"	Scott Peters	Michael Narducci & Craig Sweeny	August 19, 2007
Tom has trouble focusing on the hunt for Richard Tyler because of dreams he's been having about the future. Richard, in hiding with Isabelle, is visited by his wife, Lily, who has been dead for over a year. Meanwhile, Jordan Collier's movement is threatened when Shawn announces that he is working on a test with Kevin Burkhoff that would tell people whether or not they would die if they took a shot of promicin.
42	11	"Ghost in the Machine"	Morgan Beggs	Frederick Rappaport	August 26, 2007
A computer virus attacks Ubient Software, owned by Drew Imroth – a suspected member of the Marked. Elsewhere, Maia visits Promise City and receives an unexpected birthday gift.
43	12	"Tiny Machines"	Allison Liddi	Ira Steven Behr & Craig Sweeny	September 9, 2007
Meghan and Diana discover a way to extract the future entity out of Tom, which could cost him his life. Meanwhile, Shawn recruits a small band of promicin positives to bust Kevin out of Promise City. And Isabelle delivers Jordan Collier into the hands of the Marked.
44	13	"The Great Leap Forward"	Scott Peters	Ira Steven Behr & Craig Sweeny	September 16, 2007
Seattle falls into chaos and NTAC is forced to look to Promise City for help. Meanwhile, Isabelle is ordered to murder Kyle Baldwin and Jordan attempts to escape from the Marked.

== Specials ==
Title	Directed by	Written by	Original air date
"The 4400: Unlocking the Secrets"	Unknown	Tim Herbstrith	June 4, 2006
An hour-long summary of the events that took place in seasons one and two.
