= Skouris =

Skouris is a surname. Notable people with the surname include:

- Vassilios Skouris (born 1948), Greek judge
- Maia Skouris, fictional character
- Diana Skouris, fictional character
