= A Strange Encounter =

Studio album by Thirteen Senses
- Released: May 5, 2014
- Genre: Indie rock, Indie pop
- Length: 38:58
- Label: B-Sirius Records
- Producer: Thirteen Senses

Thirteen Senses chronology
Crystal Sounds (2011)	A Strange Encounter (2014)

A Strange Encounter is the fourth studio album by British indie rock band Thirteen Senses. It was released on 5 May 2014.

== Track listing ==
1. A Brief History 2:57
2. Stars Make Progress 7:30
3. A Strange Encounter 4:35
4. Lost 1:45
5. The Hour 1:25
6. In Lunar Light 3:22
7. Gathered Here a Stranger 5:29
8. Here and Now 1:59
9. Waves 4:41
10. In Time 5:11

== Reception ==
Norman Fleischer gave a mixed review of the album, noting the Thirteen Sense's failure to live up to the initial success of The Invitation. Fleischer writes:

"On the other side A Strange Encounter somehow also sees the band liberating itself from any expectations. But somehow it also feels a bit more like a tender final wave from a talented band like the desperately needed new start. This gives the new Thirteen Senses record a somehow bittersweet aftertaste. And ironically that's the most fitting environment for their music."
