= The 4400 =

2004 American science fiction television series

- Genre: Science fiction; Drama
- Created by: René Echevarria; Scott Peters
- Starring: Joel Gretsch; Jacqueline McKenzie; Mahershala Ali; Laura Allen; Patrick Flueger; Megalyn Echikunwoke; Chad Faust; Kaj-Erik Eriksen; Samantha Ferris; Jenni Baird; Brooke Nevin; Conchita Campbell; Karina Lombard; Billy Campbell; Peter Coyote
- Theme music composer: Amanda Abizaid
- Opening theme: "A Place in Time" (performed by Bosshouse featuring Amanda Abizaid)
- Ending theme: "Salvation" John Van Tongeren
- Composers: John Van Tongeren; George S. Clinton; Claude Foisy
- Country of origin: United States
- Original language: English
- No. of seasons: 4
- No. of episodes: 44 (list of episodes)

Production
- Executive producers: Ira Steven Behr; Scott Peters; Maira Suro; Perry Simon; René Echevarria
- Production locations: Vancouver, British Columbia, Canada
- Running time: 42 minutes
- Production companies: American Zoetrope; BSkyB (2005–2007) (Note: Credited from the sixth episode of the second season.); Renegade 83 Productions; 4400 Productions; Viacom Productions (2004); Paramount Network Television (2005); CBS Paramount Network Television (2006–2007)

Original release
- Network: USA Network (United States); Sky One (United Kingdom)
- Release: July 11, 2004 – September 16, 2007

The 4400 (pronounced "the forty-four hundred") is a science fiction television series produced by CBS Paramount Network Television in association with BSkyB, Renegade 83, and American Zoetrope for USA Network in the United States and Sky One in the United Kingdom. It was created and written by Scott Peters and René Echevarria, and it starred Joel Gretsch and Jacqueline McKenzie. The series ran for four seasons from July 11, 2004, to September 16, 2007.

== Premise ==
In the series' pilot episode, a ball of light deposits a group of 4400 people in the Cascade Range foothills near Mount Rainier, Washington, in the United States. Each of the 4400 had disappeared in a beam of green light in 1946 or after. None of them have aged from the time of their disappearance. Confused and disoriented, they have no memories of what transpired prior to their return.

== Title ==
Creator Scott Peters has stated that the series was originally titled "A Light in the Sky", but looking for something unique he decided to "play around with numbers" instead and arrived at "4400" because it "just sounded cool" and "was a very round number with two 4s and two 0s".

== Synopsis ==
Third-season cast of The 4400

The National Threat Assessment Command (NTAC), a division of the Department of Homeland Security, is in charge of dealing with the return of the 4400. Dennis Ryland is the head of NTAC. Ryland assigns Tom Baldwin and Diana Skouris as the lead team to investigate the 4400. In the second season, Ryland goes to Washington and is replaced by Nina Jarvis. In the fourth season, Meghan Doyle takes over as the head of NTAC.

Many of the returnees have trouble getting their lives back on track after being gone from the world for years. More significantly, a small number of the returnees begin to manifest paranormal abilities, such as telekinesis, telepathy and precognition, as well as other "gifts". For example, in the pilot, Shawn Farrell manifests an ability to heal the broken neck of a dead bird, bringing it back to life. In addition, one of the 4400, Lily Moore, has become pregnant between her disappearance and return.

The first-season finale, "White Light", reveals that the 4400 were abducted not by aliens, but by humans from the Earth's future, that Kyle Baldwin was to be their "messenger", and that they were returned to avert a catastrophe.

By the second season, it is revealed that all 4400 have a fictional neurotransmitter, promicin, in their brains, which gives them their powers. The government, afraid of what this large group would do with such power, had secretly been dosing all of the 4400 with a promicin inhibitor, which had worked on most, but not all, of the 4400. One of the inhibitor's side effects is a potentially fatal immune deficiency. The inhibitor is ultimately removed from the 4400 by a dose of promicin extracted by Kevin Burkhoff from the blood of the infant Isabelle, who was never given the inhibitor.

At the beginning of the third season, the Nova Group, a terrorist faction made up of 4400s, emerges. Originally formed as a "defensive" group in the aftermath of the promicin-inhibitor scandal, the Nova Group eventually carries out numerous terrorist attacks against the government and NTAC. The group is responsible for many terrorist attacks including the assassination of the men involved with the promicin-inhibitor conspiracy; the attempted assassination of Ryland; the framing of Baldwin for murder; and the driving of another person to insanity.

During the third and fourth season, it is revealed that only a certain faction from the future wants to see history changed. Another faction, which prefers the status quo, opposes the 4400, and has sent their own operatives, including Isabelle Tyler and "the Marked", into the past. The exact motives of both factions were not revealed.

Eventually, Jordan Collier, a returnee who declares himself the savior of humanity, makes promicin shots available to the general public. However, only half of the human population can actually tolerate promicin, and thus develop superhuman abilities, while the other half die upon taking the shot. Although the government outlaws promicin use, thousands of previously ordinary people have developed superhuman abilities, severely complicating NTAC's task. Collier later annexes a part of Seattle and transforms it into "Promise City", a self-proclaimed paradise open to all people with superhuman abilities. The US government attempts to reclaim Promise City but meets with little success.

At the conclusion of the series, Danny Farell's uncontrolled ability exposed some of the residents of Seattle to promicin, resulting in about 9,000 deaths and as many newly empowered humans, while at the same time forcing the remains of NTAC (now themselves mostly promicin-positive) to ask Jordan Collier and his followers (as the only group immune to the 50% chance of death from exposure) to become the de facto government of Seattle. The series ended with a cliffhanger, with Collier pledging to build the future he had promised, while the government watches uneasily as Collier's militia remains in control of Seattle, now known as Promise City.

=== Promicin ===
In the series, promicin is a fictional neurotransmitter the human body produces that controls and regulates bodily functions. In the 4400, it enables every member to use parts of the cerebellum no human has previously used. This is the cause of the new abilities in each returnee. Promicin's behavior and effects are unpredictable, potentially giving any ability. As part of a government conspiracy, every 4400 is regularly injected with a promicin-inhibitor, suppressing their potential new abilities.

Since the government ceases injecting promicin inhibitor, every 4400 develops an ability.

Dr. Kevin Burkhoff devises a way to artificially create 4400 abilities through a series of promicin injections, using himself as a test subject, giving him regenerative abilities. The government finds out about this breakthrough and builds up its own stockpile of a much purer promicin (extracted from Isabelle Tyler), which they in turn use to create at least one group of soldiers with 4400 abilities, as demonstrated by the government's attack on Promise City. Jordan Collier steals the government's supply, and begins distributing it via human couriers to anyone who wants the shot.

An injection of promicin has a 50% chance of either killing the person taking the injection (by way of an aneurysm) or giving them a 4400 ability. In the fourth season, Dr. Burkhoff claims to have discovered how promicin interacts with the body, thus being able to predict whether a person will survive the shot or not. It is explained that nine out of ten left-handed people who take the shot survive. In the brain there is a small part called the corpus callosum. It is essentially a bundle of neural fibres that connects the two hemispheres and it is usually slightly larger in left-handed people than it is in right-handed people. That is why left-handed people survive; the size of that part of the brain helps determine whether or not a person will be able to integrate a new neurotransmitter. With further research, Dr. Burkhoff believes a simple CAT scan will be able to tell how anyone's body will react to a promicin shot.

There exists a substance that can eliminate all traces of promicin in the human body, effectively robbing the injected individual of any 4400 powers and in addition making this person allergic to promicin. The identity and makeup of this substance is not stated, and the only known source of it so far is from the future. A second method also exists for removing promicin from non-4400 humans, through the promicin-neutralizing ability of Jordan Collier.

There also appears to be a substance that can counteract the anti-promicin's effects as Tom Baldwin, during his time as a member of the "Marked", uses this substance to help Isabelle Tyler regain her powers by removing her promicin allergy. Like the anti-promicin, this substance appears to be from the future.

As discovered by Marco in the episode "The Starzl Mutation", Seattle Presbyterian Hospital started using a flawed radiation machine to treat cancer patients in 1969. The microswitches that controlled the machine were not functioning properly, so the doses were incorrect. This went on for just under five years. Once the hospital recognized the issue, they tested everyone who had ever been exposed to it and in some cases the radiation induced a small mutation. This mutation was a slight alteration of the eleventh chromosome, named the "Starzl mutation" after the manufacturer of the faulty machine.

The mutation is hereditary, meaning people that got it passed it onto their children. The Starzl mutation is both harmless and conserved in those offspring; they live normal healthy lives. While the offspring of a returnee normally do not retain the ability to generate promicin, a second-hand report from John Shaffner (an ex-special operations soldier) suggested that the offspring of a 4400 and a Starzl mutant will be "promicin-positive", meaning they will have abilities. This is believed by Tom Baldwin and Diana Skouris to be the reason the abductees were returned to the Seattle area – it is the only place they are likely to encounter individuals who possess the Starzl mutation and therefore the only place they are likely to produce children with 4400 abilities.

The promicin-inhibitor "piggybacks on glucose", after entering the brain through facilitated diffusion. It is a binding protein; that is, it binds itself to promicin in the body and neutralizes it. If there is no promicin for it to bind to, it remains in the body. Eventually, it builds up to toxic levels in the lymph nodes, damaging the immune system. The result is a chemically induced immunodeficiency.

To counteract the promicin inhibitor, Dr. Burkhoff develops a serum containing Isabelle's pure promicin. This serum neutralizes the charge so the inhibitor is not able to cross membranes and can be flushed out of the body.

=== Setting ===
The 4400 is set in Seattle, Washington, United States, but actually filmed in the Vancouver, British Columbia, Canada, area. Settings include:

- Promise City: founded by Jordan Collier with the guidance of Kyle Baldwin. It is created as a haven for people who are promicin-positive (P-positives), and also serves as the base of Collier's movement to spread promicin to the world. Collier intends for Promise City to be a model for the future, and the first stage to creating "Heaven on Earth". Though the characters claim that the location is on the Duwamish River delta, the map used and the footage featuring Promise City makes it clear this is impossible. The commentary states that Promise City was shot in Vancouver on the Burrard Inlet below the Second Narrows Bridge.
- Haspel Corporation: a fictional company whose name is also abbreviated as HaspelCorp, Haspelcorp, or Haspel Corp. The corporation's name and logo are introduced in the last minute of the episode "Graduation Day", where it is also implied that its building possesses at least 24 floors. A private defense contracting company of which Dennis Ryland is an executive, Haspel Corporation is the only known manufacturer of promicin, which they had been getting by filtering the blood from Isabelle Tyler. In the book Welcome to Promise City, Haspel Corporation has been banished out of Promise City's limits. The filming location used for HaspelCorp is the Life Sciences Centre at the University of British Columbia. It is home to the university's Life Sciences Institute and one of the medical research facilities on campus.
- The 4400 Center: a fictional building founded by Jordan Collier between the first and second seasons as a place where 4400s could take sanctuary and learn to harness their abilities, and where non-4400s could seek out the "inner" 4400 in themselves. A side effect of non-4400s joining the scheme was that they brought a great deal of money into the center. When Jordan was assassinated, Shawn Farrell (Jordan's "protégé") took over the operation of the center. Characters in the show sometimes call the 4400 Center a cult. The center was closed down and seized by the government in the third-season finale. In the fourth season, Shawn reopens the center as a base for his healing foundation. In the 4400 book Promises Broken, the 4400 center stands as the last stand against the government in the Battle for Promise City. According to a postcard in the third-season episode "Gone", the fictional location of the center is 6265 Crescent Road, Seattle, Washington. The same street address in Vancouver is the address for the Chan Centre, the real-life building portrayed as the 4400 Center.
- Highland Beach: Shot at Buntzen Lake in Coquitlam, British Columbia.
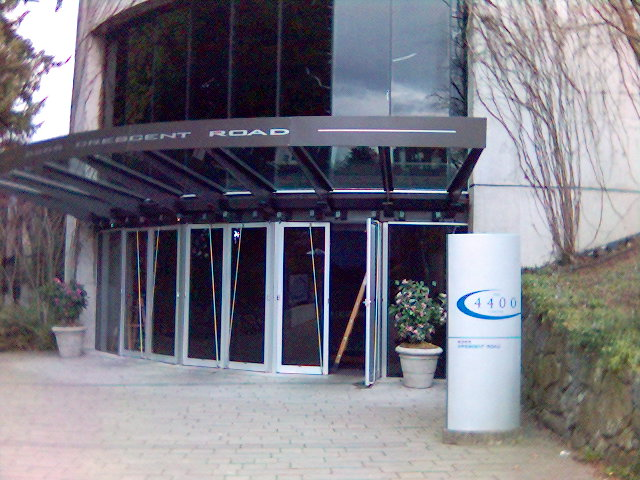
The Chan Centre (The 4400 Center)

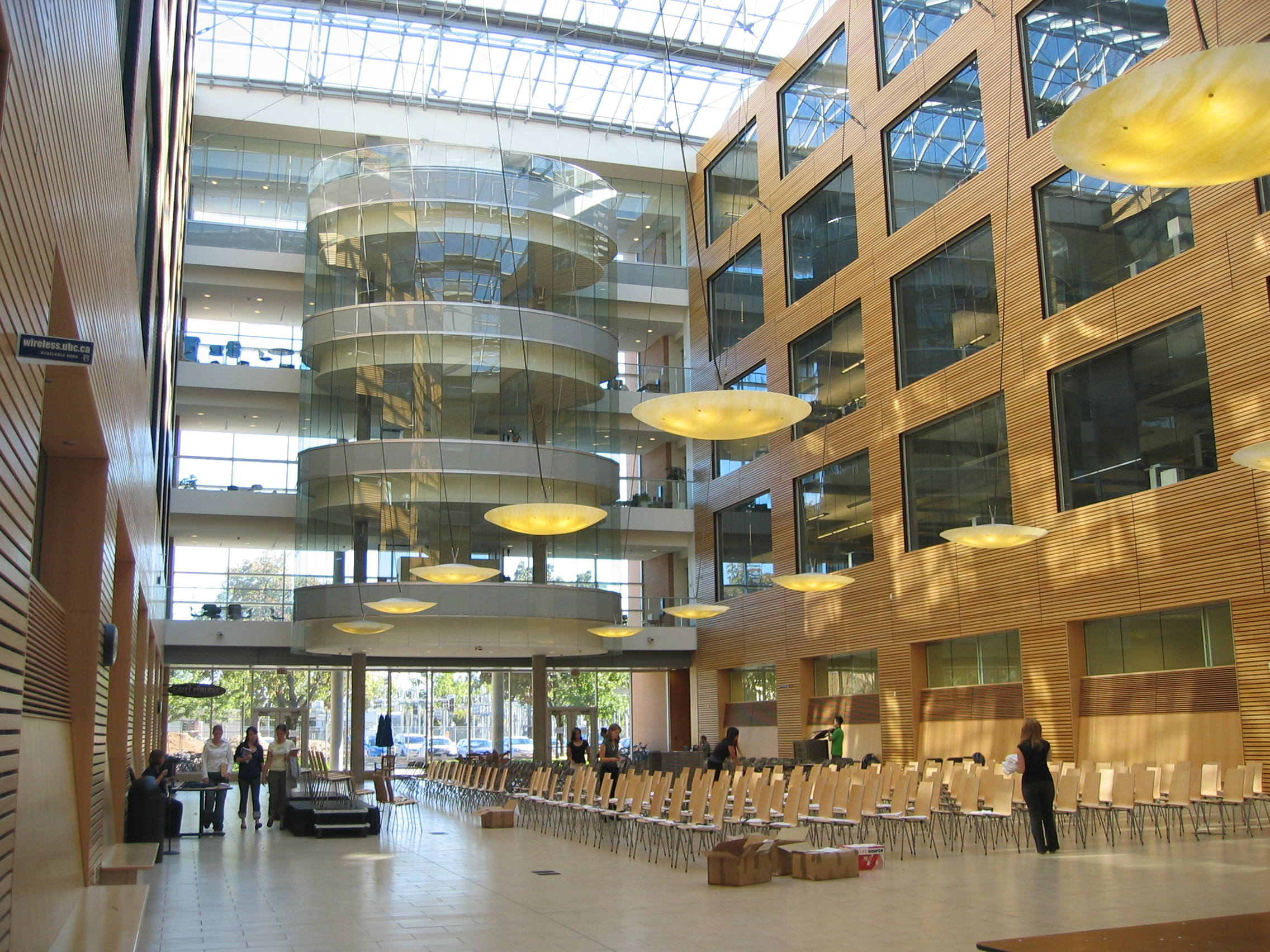
UBC Life Sciences Centre (HaspelCorp)

== Cast and characters ==
=== Series regulars ===
Actor	Character	Season			
Actor	Character	1	2	3	4
Joel Gretsch	Tom Baldwin	Main	Main	Main	Main
Jacqueline McKenzie	Diana Skouris	Main	Main	Main	Main
Mahershala Ali	Richard Tyler	Main	Main	Main	Guest
Patrick Flueger	Shawn Farrell	Main	Main	Main	Main
Conchita Campbell	Maia Skouris	Recurring	Main	Main	Main
Chad Faust	Kyle Baldwin	Main	Main	Guest	Main
Laura Allen	Lily Tyler	Main	Main	(Note: An older version of Lily is played by Tippi Hedren in one episode of the third season.)	Guest
Kaj-Erik Eriksen	Danny Farrell	Main	Recurring	Guest	Guest
Brooke Nevin	Nikki Hudson	Main	Guest	Guest	
Peter Coyote	Dennis Ryland	Main	Guest	Recurring	
Samantha Ferris	Nina Jarvis		Main	Main	
Karina Lombard	Alana Mareva		Recurring	Main	
Megalyn Echikunwoke	Isabelle Tyler		(Note: Isabelle is portrayed at various ages in eight episodes of the second season, by Jordan Lasorsa-Simon as a toddler, by Madison Pettis as a child, and by Christie Laing as an adult.)	Main	Main
Billy Campbell	Jordan Collier	Guest	Recurring	Recurring	Main
Jenni Baird	Meghan Doyle				Main

=== Recurring guest stars ===
In order of first appearance:

Actor	Character	Season			
Actor	Character	1	2	3	4
Lori Triolo	Linda Baldwin	Recurring	Guest		
Chilton Crane	Susan Farrell	Guest	Recurring	Recurring	Recurring
Richard Kahan	Marco Pacella	Guest	Recurring	Recurring	Recurring
Jeffrey Combs	Kevin Burkhoff		Recurring	Recurring	Recurring
Kavan Smith	Jed Garrity		Recurring	Recurring	Recurring
Summer Glau	Tess Doerner		Guest	Guest	Recurring
Jody Thompson	Devon Moore		Recurring	Recurring	Guest
Natasha Gregson Wagner	April Skouris		Recurring	Guest	Guest
Sharif Atkins	Gary Navarro		Guest	Guest	
Kathryn Gordon	Heather Tobey		Guest	Guest	Guest
Garret Dillahunt	Matthew Ross		Recurring	Recurring	
Tristin Leffler	Cassie Dunleavy				Recurring

== Episodes ==
Season	Episodes	Originally released	
Season	Episodes	First released	Last released
1	5	July 11, 2004	August 8, 2004
2	13	June 5, 2005	August 28, 2005
3	13	June 11, 2006	August 27, 2006
4	13	June 17, 2007	September 16, 2007

The 4400 ran for four seasons. The first season is presented as a miniseries of five episodes, which aired weekly from July 11, 2004, to August 8, 2004, with a two-hour premiere. The second, third and fourth seasons are each 13-episode seasons (counting the two-hour premieres in the second and third seasons as two episodes). A special episode, "The 4400: Unlocking the Secrets", aired between the second and third seasons, on June 3, 2006, originally on NBC.

Production of the third season was shot in Vancouver until July 26, 2006. The third season premiered June 11, 2006, with 4.2 million viewers tuning in. Executive Producer Ira Steven Behr described the third season as "bigger and more mythic. It feels like 26 episodes instead of 13 because we're cramming so much stuff in". Billy Campbell, the actor who plays Collier, took most of the third season off to sail around the world, returning in the final four episodes.

Production of the fourth and final season began in early 2007 for a mid-year premiere, returning with the episode "The Wrath of Graham".

== Books ==
- The Vesuvius Prophecy, by Greg Cox, is the first book based on the series. It was released in June 2008. Set during the show's third season, the plot revolves around Maia's prophecy of the eruption of Mount Rainier.
- Wet Work, by Dayton Ward and Kevin Dilmore, is the second original novel based on the series. Published in October 2008, it is set during the show's second season. Its plot concerns Tom and Diana's hunt for a rogue government assassin who uses her promicin powers to kill people.
- Welcome to Promise City, by Greg Cox, is the third book based on the series, and the first set after the events of the end of the series. It was published on July 28, 2009.
- Promises Broken, by David Mack, is the fourth book based on the series and the second set after the end of the show. It concludes most of the saga of the 4400, but it too ends on a cliffhanger. It was published on October 27, 2009.

== Production ==
On September 14, 2000, Variety reported that American Zoetrope, an independent film production company owned by the family of filmmaker Francis Ford Coppola, had made two television production deals; one of them being made with Viacom to produce full-length television series, having themselves been in the television production industry before with miniseries and made-for-television films like Dark Angel and Moby Dick and already produced their first full-length series First Wave for Space in Canada and the Sci-Fi Channel in the United States. The 4400 was the only product to ever come out of the American Zoetrope/Viacom deal, as Viacom would split at the start of 2006 into CBS Corporation and a new Viacom, the former of which took over Viacom's place as co-producer of the series.

The theme song of the show is "A Place in Time", written by Robert Phillips and Tim Paruskewitz and performed by Amanda Abizaid. All seasons are filmed in high-definition with closed captioning. USA Network broadcast episodes after the first season in fullscreen format; the DVD releases contain the episodes in their native widescreen format.

NBC/Universal created several sites targeted at fictional members of the 4400 universe:

- Anti-promicin
- Undecided
- Pro-promicin

Subsequent to the cancellation of the series, these web sites were allowed to lapse and none of them are active any further. Most of them have now been parked.

=== Cancellation ===
Writer and co-creator Scott Peters announced on December 18, 2007, that due to the ongoing Writers Guild of America strike, budgetary problems, and lower-than-anticipated ratings, The 4400 had been cancelled and would not be returning for a fifth season.

=== Soundtrack ===
The soundtrack to The 4400 was released on May 8, 2007, by Milan Records and includes music from the first three seasons, as follows:

1. Bosshouse featuring Amanda Abizaid – "A Place in Time" (Theme from The 4400)
2. Switchfoot – "This Is Your Life"
3. People in Planes – "Falling by the Wayside"
4. Thirteen Senses – "Into the Fire"
5. Ivy – "Worry About You"
6. Engineers – "How Do You Say Goodbye?"
7. Maroon 5 – "She Will Be Loved"
8. Jacqueline McKenzie – "Shy Baby"
9. Bedroom Walls – "Do the Buildings and Cops Make You Smile?"
10. Billie Holiday – "Cheek to Cheek"
11. John Van Tongeren – "Salvation"
12. The Landau Orchestra – "A Place in Time" (instrumental arrangement)

The last track does not appear in the series. Although not included on the soundtrack, "Life for Rent" by Dido was used in the episode "The Gospel According to Collier". The song "Where Is My Mind?" by the Pixies was later used in the series finale.

== Home media ==
Season	Episodes	Discs	DVD release date		
Season	Episodes	Discs	Region 1	Region 2	Region 4
1	5	2	December 21, 2004	January 10, 2005	June 10, 2005
The DVD contains no bonus features. The DVD is presented in a dual DVD case with a green-on-black cover showing the characters Tom, Diana and Dennis.
2	13	4	May 23, 2006	June 5, 2006	May 23, 2006
Bonus features include featurettes and commentary from Jacqueline McKenzie, Joel Gretsch, Craig Sweeny and Ira Steven Behr.
3	13	4	May 8, 2007	July 23, 2007	June 7, 2007
Bonus features include an introduction by the series creator, four featurettes, six audio commentaries and a gag reel.
4	13	4	May 6, 2008	June 30, 2008	July 10, 2008
Bonus features include 2 featurettes, blooper reel, deleted scenes, audio commentaries and The Great Leap Forward (Director's cut).
The Complete Series	44	15	October 28, 2008	October 6, 2008	August 6, 2009
Bonus features include video introduction by creator Scott Peters, pilot episode commentary by Scott Peters and Joel Gretsch, The 4400: Ghost Season, and deleted scenes (seasons 1, 2, and 3)

The first season was released on Blu-ray in Germany during August 2017, with the remaining seasons releasing in the subsequent months.

Via Vision Entertainment released the complete series on Blu-ray in Australia on November 25, 2020.

== Reception ==
The 4400 received positive reviews from critics. The review aggregator website Rotten Tomatoes reports a 95% approval rating.

== Reboot ==
In November 2018, it was announced that a reboot of The 4400 was in development at The CW. Taylor Elmore and Craig Sweeny, the latter of whom worked on the original series throughout its entire run as a writer and later as a supervising producer, would write and serve as executive producers of the "reimagined" series through their deals with the original series' producer, CBS Television Studios. Elmore would serve as showrunner should the project move forward.

In February 2019, it was reported that the project would roll over to the next development cycle to allow Elmore and Sweeny to finish the pilot script. In February 2021, the CW ordered the show straight-to-series for the Fall 2021 season. Riverdale co-executive producer Ariana Jackson and Anna Fricke will serve as showrunners. In March 2021, Joseph David-Jones and Khailah Johnson were cast as series regulars. In April 2021, Brittany Adebumola, Jaye Ladymore and Amarr Wooten joined the cast as series regulars. In May 2021, TL Thompson, Cory Jeacoma, Ireon Roach, Derrick A. King and Autumn Best were also cast. The series premiered on October 25, 2021. In May 2022, the series was canceled after one season.

== See also ==
- The Refugees – Three billion people from the future have traveled to the present to escape from an imminent global disaster.
- The Crossing – Refugees fleeing a war seek asylum in an American town—but they claim to be from America, 180 years in the future.
- Beforeigners – A "time migration" occurs all over the world, with people from the Stone Age, Viking Age, and the 19th century. Set in Oslo.
- Manifest – Flight 828 carrying 191 passengers and crew goes missing in 2013 then mysteriously lands over 5 years later, with everyone still the same age.
