= Amanda Abizaid =

American Lebanese singer/songwriter

Amanda Jo Abizaid
- Born: Beirut, Lebanon
- Education: Corcoran School of the Arts and Design, Catholic University of America
- Occupations: singer-songwriter, actress, model

Amanda Jo Abizaid is an American Lebanese model, actress, and singer/songwriter, known for her vocal performance on the theme song of the USA Network/Sky One science fiction TV series The 4400.

== Early years ==
Amanda Jo Abizaid was born in Beirut, Lebanon and she’s of American, Lebanese and Mexican descent. She traveled the Middle East and Europe with her family before the age of ten, when she moved with her mother and brother to the United States. With her four elder sisters, she formed a band and developed a talent for harmonies. Her first exposure to music was Middle Eastern music combined with the late 1970s American influences of Alice Cooper, Elton John, Crosby, Stills and Nash, and The Beatles.

After moving to the U.S., Abizaid lived in Poughkeepsie, New York until moving to Great Falls, Virginia for high school. She later attended the Corcoran School of Art in Georgetown and then transferred to the Catholic University of America to study drama and music, while pursuing a career in hairstyling. She dropped out of college to work as a runway model with designers such as Jacques Fath, Nina Ricci, Oscar de la Renta, Alberta Ferretti, Badgley Mischka, Chloé, and Bill Blass. She traveled to Paris and Germany and modeled for London designer Zandra Rhodes in the UK. Afterward, she returned to the U.S. to live in Miami, Florida, where she met musician/songwriter Shane Soloski in the late 1990s and decided to move to Los Angeles to form a band with him.

Their first gig was an open mic at Molly Malone's where she met and played with Todd Sucherman (drummer for Styx). After several open mics around Los Angeles, she and Soloski formed a band called Blue which included musicians Eric Dover (guitarist for Alice Cooper), Ron Dziubla (guitarist/saxophonist for Ricky Martin), Brian Head (drummer for Foreigner), Mike Mennell (bassist for Tom Jones), and Taylor Mills (singer for Brian Wilson). They played a series of shows in Los Angeles at The Gig and The Mint and broke up in 2001 just before releasing their first album. She then recorded and performed as a backup vocalist for Jennifer Stills and as a backup vocalist for Kathleen Bird York (known for her Oscar-nominated song "In the Deep" from Crash). Abizaid began recording vocal sessions for several TV shows with writers Stephen Phillips and Tim P. from Bosshouse Music, as well as two songs for the 2002 film Devious Beings. She was also the voice for Ally Sheedy and Charisma Carpenter on the TV show Strange Frequency (2001), singing a vocal recorded duet with Sebastian Bach. Due to the success of The 4400, New York Post columnist Adam Buckman wrote on August 28, 2005, "I'd like to thank two singers — one named Sia and the other named Amanda Abizaid — for making TV all the more memorable this summer."

== Solo years ==
Now an established artist in Los Angeles, Abizaid has performed as a solo artist releasing a single, two EPs, and one LP working with musicians Eric Dover, Ron Dziubla, Mike Mennell, Thom Gimbel (keyboardist/saxophonist for Foreigner), Brian Head, and Brian Tichy (drummer for Ozzy Osbourne). Abizaid has played shows at venues around the Los Angeles area. She played at the Indiegrrl festival in the Blue Ridge Mountains in 2012 and remains an avid supporter of women in music. She was on a compilation CD called Females on Fire.

She has written and sang songs for several independent feature films, 3 Below, The 13th Alley, Dark Ascension, and wrote the theme song and starred in the short film Facing the Lion (directed, written, and edited by Joe Plonsky).

== Discography ==
- Indiegrrl Compilation, Vol. 3 (2009, indiegrrlrecords.com)
- Females on Fire 3 (2008, Warrior Girl Music)
- Paramount's The 4400: Music from the Television Series (2007, Milan Records) featuring the theme song, "A Place in Time"

Albums:

- The Great Plan, Vol. II (2005)

EPs/Singles:

- "Release Me" (2014)
- "Be In Love" (2010)
- In the Loop (2008)
- "Lebanon"/"Ata's Song" (2005)
- "High 5's"/"Undivided" (2005)
- The Great Plan, Vol. I (2004)
