= Contact (Thirteen Senses album) =

Studio album by Thirteen Senses
- Released: 2 April 2007
- Genre: Alternative rock
- Length: 49:41 (final), 50:13 (promo)
- Label: Mercury
- Producer: Danton Supple

Thirteen Senses chronology
The Invitation (2004)	Contact (2007)	Crystal Sounds (2011)

Professional ratings
Review scores
Source	Rating
AllMusic	3.5/5 stars
Rocklouder	4/5 stars
Q	3/5 stars

Contact is the second major label album by Thirteen Senses. Released in the UK on the 2 April 2007, it includes the single "All the Love in Your Hands". The album had originally been scheduled for release on 22 January, but due to more songs being written and recorded, the release was postponed. The band issued a statement on 12 December apologising for the delay and explaining that "our creative juices continued to flow, and we came up with some more material that we couldn't ignore. As a result, we had to record these songs leading to missed production deadlines." As a result of this, "Talking to Sirens" was added to the final record and the song "Final Call" from the promotional CD release of the album was taken out.

Six of the tracks from the album were previewed for a short period of time from 6 October 2006 on the official Thirteen Senses website. These were tracks 1,2,4,5,6 and 9 from the track listing below.

"Follow Me" was used in the closing sequence of the season two premiere of Kyle XY.

== Track listing ==
1. "Contact" - 3:40
2. "All the Love in Your Hands" - 3:44
3. "Animal" - 3:58
4. "Call Someone" - 3:58
5. "Follow Me" - 3:18
6. "A Lot of Silence Here" - 4:12
7. "Spirals" - 4:21
8. "Talking to Sirens" - 4:01
9. "Under the Sun" - 4:35
10. "Spark" - 4:11
11. "Ones and Zeros" + "You and I" (hidden track) - 9:43

== Initial promotional release (2006) ==
1. "Contact" - 3:39
2. "Animal" - 3:59
3. "Call Someone" - 4:00
4. "Follow Me" - 3:20
5. "A Lot of Silence Here" - 4:14
6. "Spirals" - 4:23
7. "Final Call" - 4:21
8. "Under the Sun" - 4:35
9. "All the Love in Your Hands" - 3:45
10. "Sparks" - 4:11
11. "Ones and Zeros" + "You and I" - 9:46
