= Thirteen Senses =

British indie rock band

Background information
- Origin: Penzance, Cornwall, United Kingdom
- Genres: Alternative rock; indie rock; post-Britpop; art rock
- Years active: 2001–present
- Labels: Vertigo; Mercury; PIAS
- Members: Will South; Tom Welham; Adam Wilson; Brendon James
- Website: Official site

Thirteen Senses are a post-Britpop band from Penzance, Cornwall. The group released the album The Invitation on 27 September 2004, along with several singles: "Thru the Glass", "Do No Wrong", "Into the Fire" and "The Salt Wound Routine", of which the first three reached the top 40 of the UK singles chart. Their second album, Contact, was released in April 2007. Thirteen Senses are the only Cornish band to have a top 20 single.

== History ==
Thirteen Senses started out as Soul Magician, that began in school when Will South started writing songs which he showed Adam Wilson. He in turn liked the songs and left the other band he was in at the time. Soul Magician took off when South and Wilson met Tom Welham. The latter knew Brendon James and they all became friends.

In 2002 Soul Magician released an EP, Inside A Healing Mind, which was produced by Leon Phillips. It consisted of four tracks, one of which was later released as a B-side. "Attracting Submission" is found on the "Do No Wrong" 7" vinyl. After that came in 2002 the No Other Life Is Attractive EP: the first Thirteen Senses release, produced by Dare Mason. This had five tracks. Four of them have been released as B-sides, the exception being "Sound". They then issued in 2003, Falls in the Dark, a self-released and independent demo album.

The band's next release and major label debut album was The Invitation. This consisted of twelve tracks and reached number 14 in the UK Albums Chart on its re-release.

At the beginning of 2004, and before The Invitation, Thirteen Senses released their first single, "Thru the Glass". This was released on both CD and 7" vinyl. The B-side was identical on both releases: "No Other Life Is Attractive". Later, the next single was "Do No Wrong" and it reached number 38 in the official UK singles chart. To promote it, Thirteen Senses went on tour, including a homecoming gig at the Hall for Cornwall in Truro.

The third single from the band was "Into the Fire". This was also released on two CDs and vinyl "Into The Fire" was used on BBC One's Match of the Day. After this came a re-release of "Thru the Glass" which broke the group into the UK Top 20.

The band toured both in the UK and Europe in 2005 and made several appearances at festivals such as Glastonbury, T in the Park and V Festival(although they cancelled their appearance at the Chelmsford site).

The band spent much of the latter part of 2005 and early 2006 in the recording studio, working on their next album, Contact. It was released on 2 April 2007. It was originally planned to be released in February 2007 but after playing three pre-album gigs at The Luminaire in London (on the thirteenth of the months of October, November and December), the band produced new tracks. "Talking to Sirens", one of the new tracks from Contact, was only played at the last gig. Due to the new album release date, their UK tour was rescheduled for March.

On 28 August 2007 Thirteen Senses announced through their website that they had begun recording their third album, and between April–July 2008 they previewed samples of 8 demo recordings on their Myspace page. After several months without official contact from the band, on 28 May 2009, Brendon James announced that their third studio album was close to completion and it would, "all being well, be released within the next 2–3 months".

On 16 March 2010 the band made their third album Crystal Sounds available to stream on their website, thirteensenses.com. A day later they announced this on their MySpace page and said the album would be available to stream "for a limited time". The physical version of Crystal Sounds was released on 21 February 2011 with four tracks not featured on the early release.

On 27 February 2013, the band announced via Facebook and Twitter that "work on a new album is reaching its conclusion... more news coming soon...!"

On 6 February 2014, the band announced via Facebook and Twitter that their fourth album A Strange Encounter would be released on 5 May 2014.

On 24 June 2024, the band announced via Facebook and Twitter (now also known as X) that their fifth album The Bound and the Infinite would be released on 9 August 2024.

== Band members ==
- Will South – vocals, piano, guitar
- Tom Welham – guitar, backing vocals
- Adam Wilson – bass guitar
- Brendon James – drums, percussion

== Discography ==
=== Albums ===
- The Invitation (27 September 2004, Mercury) #14 UK
- Contact (2 April 2007, Mercury) #76 UK
- Crystal Sounds (21 February 2011, B-Sirius)
- A Strange Encounter (5 May 2014, B-Sirius)
- The Bound and the Infinite (9 August 2024, B-Sirius)

=== EPs and demo albums ===
- Inside a Healing Mind EP (2002, as Soul Magician)
- No Other Life Is Attractive EP (December 2002)
- Falls in the Dark demo album (April 2003)

=== Singles ===
List of singles with selected chart positions
Title	Year	Peak chart positions	Album
Title	Year	UK	Album
"Thru the Glass"	2004	—	Falls in the Dark
"Do No Wrong"	2004	38	The Invitation
"Into The Fire"	2004	35	The Invitation
"Thru the Glass"	2005	18	The Invitation
"The Salt Wound Routine"	2005	45	The Invitation
"All the Love in Your Hands"	2007	108	Contact
"Follow Me"	2007	—	Contact
"The Loneliest Star"	2011	—	Crystal Sounds
"Home"	2011	—	Crystal Sounds

== Music videos ==
- "Thru the Glass" [first version] (2004)
- "Do No Wrong" (2004)
- "Into the Fire" (2004)
- "Thru the Glass" [second version] (2005)
- "Thru the Glass" [alternative version] (2005)
- "The Salt Wound Routine" (2005)
- "All the Love in Your Hands" (2007)
- "Follow Me" (2007)
- "The Loneliest Star" (2011)
- "Home" (2011)

== Songs in other media ==
Year	Title	Type	Song
2004	Without a Trace	TV series episode: "Thou Shalt Not"	"Do No Wrong"
2005	The Best Man	Film	"Into the Fire"
2005	Bones	TV series episode: "Pilot"	"Gone"
2005	ER	TV series episode: "The Show Must Go On"	"Into the Fire"
2005	Grey's Anatomy	TV series episode: "A Hard Day's Night"	"Into the Fire"
2005	Les Chevaliers du Ciel	Film	"Into the Fire"
2005	Match of the Day	TV sports program	"Into the Fire"
2005	Rescue Me	TV series promos: Season 2	"Into the Fire"
2005	Tru Calling	TV series episode: "The Last Good Day"	"Into the Fire"
2006	The 4400	TV series episode: "The New World"	"Into the Fire"
2006	Celebrity Big Brother 2006	TV series episode: "Show 33"	"Into the Fire"
2006	MTV Movie Awards	TV awards ceremony: Jim Carrey clip show	"Into the Fire"
2007	Dragons' Den: Where Are They Now?	TV series episode	"All the Love in Your Hands"
2007	Guiding Light	TV series episode: "Episode 15261" (21 September 2007)	"Do No Wrong"
2007	Waterloo Road	TV series; series 2 episode 1 and episode 7	"Into the Fire", Thru The Glass
2007	Kyle XY	TV series episode: "The Prophet"	"Follow Me"
2007	Kyle XY	TV series episode: "House of Cards"	"The Salt Wound Routine"
2009	Andra Avenyn	TV series episode (season 3)	"Into the Fire"
2009	ITV3	TV station promos: Drama	"Into the Fire"
2009	Kyle XY	TV series episode: "It Happened One Night"	"Home"
2009	MasterChef	TV game show episode: 8 July 2009	"Into the Fire"
2009	WrestleMania XXV	Pay-per-view TV special	"Into the Fire"
2011	UEFA Champions League	Sky Sports: Real Madrid vs Tottenham Hotspur – Live	"Thru the Glass"
2011	Pretty Little Liars	TV game show episode: "Blind Dates"	"Into the Fire"
2011	Grey's Anatomy	TV series episode: "If/Then"	"Into the Fire"
2014	Grey's Anatomy	TV series episode: "How To Save A Life"	"Into the Fire" (Eric McClarey cover)
2015	Grey's Anatomy	TV series episode: "My Next Life"	"Into the Fire"
