= The Code (American TV series) =

American military legal drama television series

- Title card
- Genre: Military; Legal drama
- Created by: Craig Sweeny; Craig Turk
- Starring: Luke Mitchell; Dana Delany; Anna Wood; Ato Essandoh; Raffi Barsoumian; Phillipa Soo
- Composer: Adam Samuel Goldman
- Country of origin: United States
- Original language: English
- No. of seasons: 1
- No. of episodes: 12

Production
- Executive producers: Craig Sweeny; Craig Turk; Carl Beverly; Sarah Timberman; Marc Webb
- Production locations: Atlanta, Georgia, Los Angeles, California
- Production companies: Action This Day!; Timberman-Beverly Productions; Black Lamb; CBS Television Studios

Original release
- Network: CBS
- Release: April 9 – July 22, 2019

The Code is an American military drama television series created by Craig Sweeny and Craig Turk. The military legal drama was ordered to series on May 11, 2018, by CBS. It aired from April 9 until July 22, 2019, on CBS.

On July 23, 2019, CBS canceled the series after one season.

== Premise ==
The Code takes place as the "United States Military's brightest minds take on America's toughest challenges inside the courtroom and out, where each attorney is trained as a prosecutor, a defense lawyer, an investigator—and a Marine."

== Cast ==
- Luke Mitchell as Captain John "Abe" Abraham, a third-generation Marine Infantry Officer who was wounded while serving in Afghanistan and became an attorney after being deemed medically unfit to serve in direct combat. He is a member of Marine Corps Base Quantico's Trial Services (prosecutor's) Office.
- Anna Wood as Captain Maya Dobbins, an eight-year veteran Marine and member of the Defense Services Office at MCB Quantico. She is from Winston-Salem, North Carolina, where her older brother Matt is running for election to the North Carolina State Senate. When his mental health issues force him to drop out of the race, the national political party asked Maya to run in his place, which she declined as she felt she wasn't yet ready to leave the Corps for political office, although that remains her long-term goal.
- Ato Essandoh as Major Trey Ferry, originally Captain Abraham's immediate supervisor in the Trial Services Office until he became Senior Defense Counsel halfway through the season. He and his wife, Nona, have struggled for years to conceive a child, undergoing IVF treatments. In "Don and Doff", he and Nona learn they are having twins, but she miscarries shortly thereafter, leaving them heartbroken.
- Raffi Barsoumian as Warrant Officer Rami Ahmadi, MCB Quantico's invaluable Legal Administrative Officer with almost nine years of service. A native of Dearborn, Michigan, Rami enlisted in the Marines as a path to become a United States citizen; on the eve of his citizenship test, Rami decided to protest the suspension of the MAVNI program, which caused him to be temporarily reassigned to the United States Marine Corps Training and Education Command until his friends convinced him to take the test lest he languish the rest of his career in a glorified rubber room. In "Legit Bad Day", Rami officially becomes a US citizen. He has been married for four years and has a daughter.
- Phillipa Soo as 1st Lieutenant Harper Li, a young Marine nine months out of Officer Candidate School, assigned to Captain Abraham as his second chair. A native of San Francisco and a graduate of Stanford University and Stanford Law School, Harper comes from a family of litigators who view her joining the Marine Corps as "backpacking through Europe after law school". While on a fact-finding mission overseas, Harper finds herself in combat for the first time alongside a group of MARSOC Raiders, during which she earns a Bronze Star with Combat "V" after taking command upon the death of the platoon commander. In "Legit Bad Day", Harper leaves for SERE School for six weeks.
- Dana Delany as Colonel Glenn Turnbull, who oversees the attorneys and helps them navigate the politics surrounding the legal system. Colonel Turnbull is married to a former Marine, now in the private sector, although they are separated; they share a son, Adam, who is a 24-year-old 1st Lieutenant. In "Legit Bad Day", she mentions that she is a third-generation Marine and her grandfather was killed during the Battle of Belleau Wood during World War I. In "Don and Doff", she learns that she was a candidate for promotion to brigadier general.

== Production ==
=== Development ===
On February 2, 2018, it was announced that CBS had given the production a pilot order. The pilot script was set to be written by Craig Sweeny who was also set as an executive producer along with Craig Turk, Carl Beverly and Sarah Timberman. Production companies involved with the pilot include CBS Television Studios and Timberman-Beverly Productions. On February 9, 2018, it was reported that Marc Webb would direct the pilot episode.

On May 11, 2018, it was announced that CBS had given the production a series order. A few days later, it was announced that the series would premiere in the spring of 2019 as a mid-season replacement. On January 15, 2019, it was announced that the series would be held back from mid-season with a premiere date of April 9, 2019. While the pilot aired on a Tuesday at 9 PM, all subsequent episodes aired weekly on Mondays during the 9 PM time slot. On July 23, 2019, CBS canceled the series after one season. Filming took place in March 2019.

=== Casting ===
In the original pilot, Dave Annable and Mira Sorvino were cast as the series' male lead and a major co-starring role, respectively. When 'The Code' was picked up, Australian actor Luke Mitchell took over the role of Captain John "Abe" Abraham from Annable, while Dana Delany took over Sorvino's role as Colonel Glenn (originally named Eisa) Turnbull.

== Episodes ==
No.	Title	Directed by	Written by	Original release date	U.S. viewers (millions)
1	"Blowed Up"	Marc Webb	Story by : Craig Turk & Craig Sweeny; Teleplay by : Craig Sweeny	April 9, 2019	8.13
2	"P.O.G."	Guy Ferland	Craig Sweeny	April 15, 2019	4.45
3	"Molly Marine"	Holly Dale	Kendall Sherwood	April 22, 2019	4.60
4	"Back on the Block"	Steve Adelson	Mimi Won Tetjemtom	April 29, 2019	4.41
5	"Maggie's Drawers"	John Polson	Nathan Alexander	May 6, 2019	4.07
6	"1st Civ Div"	John Behring	Josh Fialkov	May 13, 2019	5.54
7	"Above the Knee"	Thomas Carter	Anthony Swofford	May 20, 2019	4.97
8	"Lioness"	Jann Turner	Hope Mastras	June 3, 2019	4.63
9	"Smoke-Pit"	Ron Fortunato	Kaycee Felton-Lui	July 1, 2019	3.98
10	"Secret Squirrel"	Sarah Boyd	Jovan Robinson	July 8, 2019	3.85
11	"Don and Doff"	Eric Laneuville	Michael Angeli	July 15, 2019	3.25
12	"Legit Bad Day"	Craig Sweeny	Craig Sweeny	July 22, 2019	2.91

== Home media ==
The full complete series was released on DVD as for CBS Home Entertainment on June 30, 2020.

== Reception ==
=== Critical response ===
On Rotten Tomatoes, the series holds an approval rating of 30% based on reviews from 10 critics, with an average rating of 6.5/10. The website's critical consensus reads, "Despite its pedigree, The Code does little to differentiate itself in a crowded field." On Metacritic, it has a weighted average score of 56 out of 100, based on reviews from five critics, indicating "mixed or average reviews".

Robert Lloyd of the Los Angeles Times called it "consistently diverting" and described it as : "like JAG but in the Marines with a pleasing hint of The Good Wife". Daniel D'Addario of Variety gave a mixed review and called the show deeply familiar, and said it made NCIS look great by comparison. Dan Fienberg of The Hollywood Reporter called it a "thoroughly average procedural" and compared the show unfavorably to the film A Few Good Men. Others criticized the show for technical inaccuracies.

=== Ratings ===
Viewership and ratings per episode of The Code
No.	Title	Air date	Rating/share (18–49)	Viewers (millions)	DVR (18–49)	DVR viewers (millions)	Total (18–49)	Total viewers (millions)
1	"Blowed Up"	April 9, 2019	0.7/3	8.13	0.3	2.57	1.0	10.71
2	"P.O.G."	April 15, 2019	0.5/3	4.45	0.3	2.04	0.8	6.49
3	"Molly Marine"	April 22, 2019	0.6/3	4.60	0.2	2.10	0.8	6.70
4	"Back on the Block"	April 29, 2019	0.5/2	4.41	—N/a	2.00	—N/a	6.42
5	"Maggie's Drawers"	May 6, 2019	0.5/2	4.07	0.2	1.91	0.7	5.99
6	"1st Civ Div"	May 13, 2019	0.6/3	5.54	0.2	1.79	0.8	7.33
7	"Above the Knee"	May 20, 2019	0.7/3	4.97	0.2	1.74	0.8	6.46
8	"Lioness"	June 3, 2019	0.5/3	4.63	0.3	1.97	0.8	6.60
9	"Smoke-Pit"	July 1, 2019	0.4/2	3.98	0.2	1.88	0.6	5.87
10	"Secret Squirrel"	July 8, 2019	0.4/2	3.85	0.2	1.84	0.6	5.69
11	"Don and Doff"	July 15, 2019	0.3/2	3.25	0.2	1.70	0.5	4.95
12	"Legit Bad Day"	July 22, 2019	0.3/2	2.91	0.2	1.36	0.5	4.27

== See also ==
- JAG (TV series)
- Uniform Code of Military Justice
- List of United States Marine Corps acronyms and expressions
