= The Invitation (Thirteen Senses album) =

Studio album by Thirteen Senses
- Released: 27 September 2004
- Genre: Alternative rock; post-Britpop
- Length: 52:48
- Label: Vertigo; Mercury
- Producer: Danton Supple

Thirteen Senses chronology
Falls in the Dark (2003)	The Invitation (2004)	Contact (2007)

Singles from The Invitation
- 1. "Thru the Glass" Released: 1 March 2004; 2. "Do No Wrong" Released: 31 May 2004; 3. "Into the Fire" Released: 13 September 2004; 4. "Thru the Glass" Released: 10 January 2005 (re-release); 5. "The Salt Wound Routine" Released: 28 March 2005

The Invitation is the first major label album by English alternative rock band Thirteen Senses. Released on 27 September 2004 by Vertigo Records, it includes the singles "Do No Wrong", "Into the Fire", "Thru the Glass" and "The Salt Wound Routine". "Into the Fire" was used on trailer for the second season of the American TV show Rescue Me and in the pilot episode of Grey's Anatomy, in the closing sequence of the two-part season three premiere of The 4400, in an episode of Pretty Little Liars, a clip show for Jim Carrey at the MTV Movie Awards 2006, and on BBC One's Match of the Day.

== Release ==
The song "Thru the Glass" was released on 1 March 2004 as the debut single from The Invitation and was re-released in the United Kingdom on 10 January 2005. The re-release peaked at No. 18 on the UK Singles Chart and number 91 in the Netherlands. The limited-edition single was released on compact disc and 7-inch vinyl formats. Both tracks of the original release are remixed and remastered from the Falls in the Dark demo album sessions. The second single, "Do No Wrong", was released on 31 May 2004. It was the first single in the United Kingdom. It reached number 38 on the UK Singles Chart.

The third single, "Into the Fire", was released on 13 September 2004. It peaked on the UK Singles Chart at number 35. The song has appeared in popular culture several times, including in a 2011 YouTube video montage of the anti-government uprising in Egypt. The video, edited by Tamaar Shabaan, attracted over one and a half million views in under a week. The album's final single, "The Salt Wound Routine", was released on 28 March 2005. The track reached number 45 on the UK Singles Chart.

== Track listing ==
1. "Into the Fire" – 3:38
2. "Thru the Glass" – 4:37
3. "Gone" – 3:22
4. "Do No Wrong" – 4:52
5. "The Salt Wound Routine" – 4:38
6. "Saving" / "The Invitation" (Hidden Track) – 6:09
7. "Lead Us" – 4:46
8. "Last Forever" – 3:54
9. "History" – 3:51
10. "Undivided" – 2:44
11. "Angels and Spies" – 5:13 ^{1}
12. "Automatic" – 5:03

^{1} Not present on all versions.

== Bonus one-sided 7" vinyl ==
1. "Perfect" – 4:25 ^{2}

^{2} With the vinyl release of the album only. The song is also available as a digital download on iTunes UK.

== Japanese edition ==
This has the same tracks as the regular edition plus the following bonus material:

- "No Other Life is Attractive" – 5:45
- "Falling to the Ground" – 4:16
- "Do No Wrong" - video
- "Into the Fire" - video
- "Thru the Glass" - video (alternative 2005 version)
- "The Salt Wound Routine" - video

== Charts ==
"Thru the Glass"
Chart (2005)	Peak position
Netherlands (Single Top 100)	91
Scotland Singles (OCC)	23
UK Singles (OCC)	18
