= Conchita Campbell =

Canadian actress

- Born: Conchita Elizabeth Campbell; October 25, 1995 (age 30); Vancouver, British Columbia, Canada
- Occupation: Actress
- Years active: 2003–2020

Conchita Elizabeth Campbell (born October 25, 1995) is a Canadian actress. She is perhaps best known for playing Maia Rutledge on the USA Network series The 4400.

== Biography ==
Campbell was born in Vancouver, British Columbia. She is trained in both ballet and jazz.

== Career ==
Campbell's career started with acting in television commercials at a young age.

Campbell made two guest appearances on CTV's hit show, Cold Squad. She starred in Wilder Days with Peter Falk and Tim Daly in 2003.

She is known for her role as Maia Rutledge-Skouris on the USA channel miniseries and show, The 4400 (2004–2007). There she portrays a returned 'child abductee' who has been missing for decades. When 'returned', she has not aged and is imbued with the psychic ability to foretell the future.

In 2004, she starred in the small indie-film, Pursued, opposite Gil Bellows, Michael Clarke Duncan and Christian Slater. Though she filmed a small role in Bob the Butler, her scenes were deleted. Her feature film debut ultimately came with Scary Movie 4, which set a box office record for Easter weekend 2006.

== Filmography ==
=== Film ===
Year	Title	Role	Notes
2004	Pursued	Alison Keats	
2006	Scary Movie 4	Rachel	
2014	Sitting on the Edge of Marlene	Mandy Morris	

=== Television ===
Year	Title	Role	Notes
2003	Just Cause	Emma / Abigail	Episode: "Hide and Seek"
2003	Wilder Days	Lexy Morse	TV film
2004–2007	The 4400	Maia Skouris	Main role
2005	Zixx	Freeda	Episode: "Pet Project"
2005	Cold Squad	Young April	Episodes: "The Filth", "And the Fury"
2007	Supernatural	Maggie Thompson	Episodes: "Playthings"
2013	Bates Motel	Kennedy	Episodes: "First You Dream, Then You Die", "The Man in Number 9"
2015	Perfect Match	Kate	TV film
2018	The Good Doctor	Sarah Buendia	Episode: "Middle Ground"
2020	Gourmet Detective: Roux the Day	Heather	TV film

== Awards and nominations ==
For her role of Maia Skouris on the television series The 4400, Campbell was nominated three times for a Young Artist Award: twice in the category of Best Performance in a TV Series (Comedy or Drama) in 2005 and 2007, as well as one nomination for Best Performance in a TV Series (Drama): Supporting Young Actress in 2006.

In 2008 for her guest role of Maggie Thompson on the series Supernatural, episode: "Playthings", she was nominated for a Young Artist Award in the category of Best Performance in a TV Movie, Miniseries or Special: Supporting Young Actress.
