= List of The 4400 characters =

This is a list of fictional characters in the television series The 4400. The list includes the series main characters, recurring characters, minor characters, as well a list of the 4400 returnees.

== Main characters ==
=== Tom Baldwin ===
Tom Baldwin, portrayed by Joel Gretsch, is the series's main protagonist. Tom was formerly at the FBI, and a longtime friend of Dennis Ryland. He joined Ryland at NTAC, but left after 5 months to investigate the circumstances surrounding his son, Kyle Baldwin, being comatose. He employed private investigators to find his missing nephew Shawn Farrell, in an attempt to discover the truth. Kyle's comatose state places great strain on Tom's marriage to Kyle's mother, Linda, and at some point before the Pilot the two have separated.

=== Kyle Baldwin ===
Kyle Baldwin, portrayed by Chad Faust, is Tom and Linda's son and Shawn Farrell's cousin. He is possessed by a human being from the future, who reveals he was supposed to act as a communication channel between the future and Tom, to guide him in his dealings with the returned 4400 as they attempt to avoid the catastrophe that has caused humans to largely die out. He is responsible for the murder of Jordan Collier and spends several months in prison. He takes promicin to gain healing abilities but instead developed an imaginary guide that assumed the appearance of a woman named Cassie Dunleavy. At the end of the series he convinces his father to also take a promicin shot.

=== Jordan Collier ===
Jordan Collier, portrayed by Billy Campbell, is one of the central figures of the 4400. Intelligent and persuasive, he quickly recognized the 4400 and their situation as being on a war footing with the government. Although his motives and means change during the course of the series from greed to altruism, Jordan's greatest wish appears to be that he will be remembered as a hero who changed the world, in the eye of the future. Jordan Collier's ability to neutralize promicin is discovered in "The Wrath of Graham" when he strips Graham Holt of his ability. It is theorized that this ability only works on promicin-positive non-4400s. Jordan Collier and Danny Farrell have the exact opposite ability.

Collier was initially described to Campbell as an "interesting" character rather than as a villainous role, a characterization that Campbell believes that the writers stuck with. Eric Goldman of IGN described Collier as "a fascinatingly morally ambiguous figure; one who seems like a Jesus figure one moment and nearly genocidal in another". Campbell himself has described the character as "a sociopath" and "ever manipulative".

=== Shawn Farrell ===
Shawn Farrell, portrayed by Patrick Flueger, was born December 12, 1983, and disappeared April 22, 2001 from Highland Beach near Seattle, Washington, while with his cousin Kyle Baldwin. Shawn was not intended to be a 4400; as Kyle and Shawn are drinking at the beach, Shawn witnesses Kyle in the act of being abducted, and in an effort to help him, interrupts the process and is taken instead. Shawn has the ability to control the flow of life in living organisms, usually manifesting itself through healing physical damage done to the bodies of others. Limits for this power are unclear; although he is capable of basic healing, having successfully healed broken bones, severe burns and even a mortal stab through the chest, but is later able to heal people with cancer and all sorts of diseases. His ability is by close proximity - he tends to touch his targets, but can heal through clothing. When threatened he can reverse his power and drain the life-force from others, effectively killing them. He uses this latter ability to drive a possessing entity out of Kyle, and in a vision of the future he witnessed – in which, the catastrophe itself ripped the United States apart – he kills Richard Tyler, in apparent retaliation for Richard's pre-emptive strike (against whom has not yet been explicitly revealed). He is also forced to use this ability on his brother Danny as a mercy killing.

=== Nina Jarvis ===
Nina Jarvis, portrayed by Samantha Ferris, became the director of NTAC in season two after succeeding Dennis Ryland; Ryland took his role back temporarily while Nina recovered from a gunshot wound. Nina returned as the director of NTAC after recovering from her injuries. Nina was later dismissed and replaced by Meghan Doyle.

=== Alana Mareva ===
Alana Mareva, portrayed by Karina Lombard, was born October 17, 1969, in Tahiti, and disappeared September 5, 2001, from Seattle, Washington. Prior to her abduction, her husband and only son Billy had been killed by a drunk driver. She was an artist who owned an art gallery and travelled the world to purchase pieces for display there. Alana can telepathically create a completely realistic subjective alternate reality that she and a person with whom she is in physical contact can perceive. The reality can incorporate ideas from Alana or from her subject and is normally indistinguishable from objective reality. A great deal of time can pass in such realities while very little objective time passes. There is evidence that subjective realities of long duration accumulate subtle errors that permit the subconscious of the subject to recognize them for what they are. Tom Baldwin eventually realized that he was in subjective reality because of such errors. Alana was at that time subjected to the effects of the promicin-inhibitor. Most 4400s developed their abilities or refined their control when no longer dosed with the inhibitor. In season three, Diana Skouris was able to remain in the alternate reality without Alana. It was revealed by that incident that a participant in the alternate reality must be consciously willing to leave it.

=== Dennis Ryland ===
Dennis Ryland, portrayed by Peter Coyote, was the original supervisor and director of NTAC (National Threat Assessment Command) during season one. Ryland was close friends with agent Tom Baldwin for many years. The two worked together at the FBI, and Ryland arranged for Tom to transfer with him to NTAC; this would damage their relationship, as Tom left after only 5 months to investigate the circumstances surrounding his son Kyle's comatose state. Ryland reinstates Tom into NTAC in the Pilot episode, recognizing that Tom is still one of his best agents, and partners him with Diana Skouris. During season one, Ryland is constantly portrayed as sympathetic to the 4400 and darkly amused when he informs Skouris and Baldwin that it's their job to resolve the mystery of the 4400's new-found abilities. However, as soon as Orson Bailey demonstrated his power of telekinesis, Ryland secretly ordered a separate investigation into the cause of the paranormal abilities, and possible methods of curtailing them. When a 4400 began to compel others to commit murder, Ryland ordered that the incomplete promicin inhibitor be used, in order to safeguard the country. During the final episode of season two, Ryland is arrested for his involvement for the production and administration of the Promicin inhibitor to unsuspecting returnees. He is put on trial because of the inhibitor scandal and T.J. Kim of the Nova Group causes Ryland's lawyer to attack him. The attempt fails and a hospitalized Ryland is later attacked by the telepath Gary Navarro. In season three he begins working as the leader of a privately owned company, Haspel Corporation, a defense contractor aiding the NSA in the tracking of the Nova Group, a terrorist organization of 4400 returnees. His prime motivation is based on his belief that the existence of civilians with 4400 abilities is a danger to the country, and works to limit the use of supernatural abilities created by promicin to the military and the government.

=== Diana Skouris ===
Diana Skouris, portrayed by Jacqueline McKenzie, was partnered with Tom Baldwin in the pilot episode to investigate the 4400 returnees. The first, eight-year-old Maia Rutledge, asks to move in with her in the season one episode "The New and Improved Carl Morrissey". Diana adopts her in Season Two. At the beginning of season 4, Diana is seen in a vision/dream of Jordan Collier with the power to freeze time, although later in the show, it's revealed that she is immune to the effect of promicin.

=== Maia Skouris ===
Maia Skouris, portrayed by Conchita Campbell, was born February 28, 1938, and disappeared March 3, 1946, at age 8 from Crescent City, California. She is the earliest of the returnees to be taken and the first to exhibit a special ability. Maia began recording her visions in diaries. She was adopted by Diana Skouris in Season 2. Maia is able to see future events (precognition). Generally, this ability is difficult for Maia to control and visions appear to her without warning. With concentration, however, she is able to predict specific events, first seen when her Aunt April helps her win at gambling. In the season three episode "Gone (Part 1)" she admits that she has gained greater control of her ability since she is no longer taking the promicin inhibitor.

=== Lily Tyler ===
Lily Tyler, portrayed by Laura Allen (young) and Tippi Hedren (aged), was born August 4, 1966, and disappeared May 26, 1993, from Orlando, Florida. Her parents divorced when she was at the age of 14. At the time of abduction, she was married to Brian Moore, and is the mother to Heidi Moore. While she was in the future, Richard's DNA was extracted and put into her. She has the power of empathy and uses it to read Isabelle's feelings. Another possible power of hers would be age transmission, i.e. to transfer day, or years from other people's lives to herself and vice versa. Since the instant change of age between Isabelle and Lily happened exactly after Lily was freed from the effect of the promicin-inhibitor, it's to be said that Isabelle, unintentionally, used her mother's power against her. An image of Lily is created in One of Us, to convince Richard to restore Isabelle, now a baby, back to her adult form. She is created by a fellow 4400 on behalf of Kyle Baldwin. This Lily has no memory of events after she passed out whilst looking for Isabelle in the season two finale. After convincing Richard that his actions were wrong, she begins to fade, and Richard realizes what he had suspected all along; that she was not "really" Lily, Lily having died a year before. She finally fades away, telling Richard she loves him, as he holds her. The real Lily also appears in flashback form in "One of Us"; the "marked" Tom Baldwin remembers operating on her and Richard in the future after their initial abduction, impregnating Lily with Richard's child. Executive producer Ira Steven Behr originally pitched season three with the continuation of the character, but was told by the network to write her out of the show for "business reasons". Laura Allen, the actress who played Lily, subsequently accepted a role on another show. The season three opening episode presents Lily as an aged woman, portrayed by Tippi Hedren.

=== Richard Tyler ===
Richard Tyler, portrayed by Mahershala Ali, was one of the first 4400s to be shown, Richard is Lily Tyler's husband, and is the father of her second daughter, Isabelle Tyler. Born in 1922 in St. Louis, Missouri, and disappeared on May 11, 1951, Richard joined the U.S. Air Force and piloted their fighter jets in the Korean War. When his fellow officers and "friends" discovered he was having an affair with a white woman, Lily Bonham, they beat him. When they left Richard alone, he was abducted. This happened on May 11, 1951. While he was in the future, Richard's DNA was extracted and put into another abducted person, Lily Moore, Lily Bonham's granddaughter. The promicin-inhibitor entirely suppressed Richard's ability, leading him to believe he was one of many returned without an ability. After the inhibitor scandal and the cessation of inhibitor injections Richard developed telekinesis. His control of the ability was initially poor. Fearing his daughter, he worked with Heather Tobey to refine his control and can now more precisely control what he affects and where he moves it. When Richard reappears in Daddy's Little Girl, his powers have become far more powerful and refined. He demonstrates a much greater precision over small objects. He is able to summon a tomato to his hand from a great distance, stop a tranquilizer dart, and even render someone unconscious by pinching off the blood flow to the person's brain. He is able to effortlessly throw multiple full-grown adults through the air or pin them against walls- even if not in the immediate vicinity- as well as fling concrete barriers weighing hundred or possibly thousands of pounds with pinpoint accuracy.

=== Isabelle Tyler ===
Isabelle Tyler, portrayed by Megalyn Echikunwoke (adult, seasons 3–4), Christie Laing (adult, season 2), Jordan Lasorsa-Simon (toddler), and Madison Pettis (child), is the daughter of Richard Tyler and Lily Moore, Isabelle is technically not a 4400, she was born after the 4400 were returned, after the first season of the show. Isabelle possesses several paranormal abilities, though they were temporarily removed by an injection sent by the people from the future: the ability to create illusions, limited precognition, control over others' powers, tissue regeneration, improved learning abilities, telekinesis, telepathy and psychopyresis. She was not affected by Shawn Farrell's ability to drain someone's life-force. She had worked with Haspel Corporation and was the source of the promicin they used in attempts to induce 4400 mutations in people who were never abducted. She left after HaspelCorp's team was destroyed by Boyd Gelder's suicide bomb. Afterwards, she moved to attack the 4400 Center but ended up losing her abilities when her father used his telekinesis to inject her with a serum given to Tom Baldwin by the people from the future. She was shot by Baldwin, but survived, and was held in custody. In the fourth-season premiere, she was visited in prison by Baldwin, who was looking for information on his missing girlfriend, Alana, believing Isabelle would have the closest connection to the people from the future. During the episode Fear Itself, it is revealed by a prison official that Isabelle has contracted a promicin allergy and would die if she takes the promicin shot, made available by Jordan Collier to try to regain her abilities. During the episode "One of Us", it is revealed that the agent from the future who is possessing Tom Baldwin intends to restore Isabelle's powers via complete blood transfusion. In the episode "Tiny Machines", she is seen using her powers on Jordan Collier's bodyguards. –

=== Meghan Doyle ===
Meghan Doyle, portrayed by Jenni Baird only appeared in Season Four as the new head of NTAC. Doyle graduated summa cum laude from Yale University with a joint degree in economics and sociology. She studied at Cambridge University as a Marshall Scholar before returning to the states and earning a PhD in political science, specializing in conflict negotiation. She was recruited by a government think tank where she designed response protocols for natural disasters and terrorist attacks. Integral in the writing of a 2004 document outlining the government's response to the 4400's return, Doyle proved herself an expert in the field. She was nominated by Rebecca Parrish, Director of National Intelligence, to take over for Nina Jarvis at NTAC-Seattle. In the last episode it is shown that she has developed the ability of transmutation by accidentally turning her pen into a flower.

== Recurring characters ==
=== Linda Baldwin ===
Linda, played by Lori Triolo, is the ex-wife of Tom and mother of Kyle. She appears throughout the first season. She and Tom have drifted apart during Kyle's time in a coma and Linda files for divorce. She is also friends with Dennis Ryland who notes he danced with her at their wedding. She is one of the first to realise Shawn was responsible for Kyle recovering from his coma. Tom moves back in with her and Kyle in an attempt to jog his memories. She helps Tom and Diana with retrieving Kyle from federal custody. By the second season, hers and Tom's divorce has been finalised. Her only subsequent appearance is in "Hidden", where she hides Kyle after he begins to realise he is Jordan Collier's assassin.

=== Kevin Burkhoff ===
Played by Jeffrey Combs, Kevin first appeared in the season two premiere episode "Wake Up Call", in which he was a patient in a psychiatric hospital. Kevin suffered from paranoid personality disorder and had not spoken in six years, and was friends with a schizophrenic 4400 named Tess Doerner. Tess used her 4400 ability to get everyone in the hospital to build a machine she saw in her mind, mistakenly believing that it would contact the future. When the machine was built, it created a pulse that released everyone from Tess' mind control and cured Kevin of his mental illness. It was then revealed that Kevin was a world-renowned neuroscientist and likely the "father of the 4400 technology".

Kevin was the one who discovered how to cure the side effects of the promicin inhibitor during the season two finale.

In the third season, Kevin begins to inject himself with promicin in order to gain some type of 4400 ability. The shots he took disfigured his appearance by causing wounds on his chest and loss of his nails, though in exchange it granted him rapid (but inconsistent) healing of muscle tissue. This was first demonstrated when he put a scalpel through his hand and it healed within seconds. After several months of injections, his entire body was covered in lesions and decaying tissue, but his regenerative abilities were now fully active, as he literally resurrects himself after taking four nine millimeter rounds to the chest at the hands of one of Dennis Ryland's agents and being placed in a body bag for autopsy.

After a failed attempt by him and Tess to perform the same promicin-injection procedure on Diana Skouris, he shed his skin like a snake, revealing an untarnished appearance. Kevin now possesses the paranormal ability to regenerate.

Kevin and Tess Doerner ran away together in the season three episode "The Ballad of Kevin and Tess"; later, in the episode "Terrible Swift Sword", it is revealed that they went to work at a small town garage where Tess used her ability to bring customers to the local businesses. Kevin and Tess were recruited to help Jordan Collier steal Dennis Ryland's promicin, and they are currently in hiding with Collier.

During their time with Collier, without proper medication, Tess once again comes under the influence of her schizophrenia and leaves, causing Kevin to follow her. He is later seen in a small town where Tess forces most of the denizens to participate in her "sweet sixteen", but due to an intervention by Shawn Farrell, Tess is cured of her illness. Kevin is then enlisted by Shawn to create a promicin-profiency test that can tell if one is going to survive a promicin shot or not. Before he is finished, Kevin is then kidnapped by Kyle Baldwin, who believes the test will ruin the promicin distribution movement.

The serum Kevin Burkhoff injected himself with to gain an ability was not the same solution of pure promicin that was used to cure the 4400 of the inhibitor. Kevin makes it very clear in "The New World" that he is injecting himself "with a modified version of the promicin serum". The promicin given away to the public by Jordan Collier comes directly from Isabelle's veins, which is why the promicin shots have a 50-50 chance of either killing the recipient (with multiple brain aneurysms) or giving an ability.

=== Susan Farrell ===
Susan (Chilton Crane) is the sister of Tom Baldwin and the mother of Shawn and Danny. She is a single mother, her husband having left her years previous. She is first seen reacting to Shawn's return and welcomes him home but reacts badly when his powers manifest and cause him to begin draining Danny's life force. Despite this, she attempts to maintain a relationship with Shawn after he moves to the 4400 Centre, inviting him over for a family meal to try to build bridges between him and Danny, and enthusiastically supporting his attempt to marry Isabelle.

During the fourth and final season, Shawn moves back in with Susan and Danny for a short while following his estrangement from Collier. She later discovers that Danny has taken a promicin shot after getting confirmation from Kevin that it is safe for him. However, she is the first person to succumb to Danny's contagious promicin. She dies in the series finale as a result of promicin rejection, with her and Danny later being buried alongside each other.

=== Marco Pacella ===
Marco Pacella (Richard Kahan) is in charge of NTAC's theory room, and is the one who initially proposed that each 4400 has caused a "ripple effect". He often appears to somewhat resent his colleagues, at one point labeling them as the "Two most annoying people on the planet".

His relationship with the NTAC agents Tom Baldwin and Diana Skouris is strained at first; Tom had little patience for the Theory Room's methodology, and Diana claims that he intimidates Marco and his colleagues. When Tom prepares to rescue his son Kyle, Diana goes to Marco for help. At this point, Marco hints at his feelings toward Diana, claiming that he isn't helping for Tom's benefit; the look of shock on Diana's face implies that she had been completely unaware of his feelings.

Marco continues to aid the NTAC agents from the Theory Room. His friendship with Diana grows, with her teasing him affectionately. He makes a forgery of Diana's daughter Maia Skouris' vision diary, so that Diana will not have to hand the real one to the government for analysis. Maia had even predicted Marco's future death in her diary. Although surprised when he read about it, he thought that the manner of his foretold death was "actually pretty cool".

Marco and Diana finally begin a relationship during the season 2 finale, "Mommy's Bosses", as Marco says he will support Diana through the long process of bringing the promicin inhibitor conspirators to trial.

In the season 3 episode "Blink", Diana ends the relationship with Marco as she believes she is using him to avoid becoming close to a man more her type. Despite being hurt at the rejection, Marco is never shown to be anything other than supportive of her. Whilst dating Diana, Marco had become friendly with her daughter Maia, and Maia asks after him even after the breakup.

Marco informs Diana that April is missing and in possession of promicin, leading to Diana's reinstatement into NTAC and move back.

He later believes that making conspiracy movies is the ability of 4400 Curtis Peck. When Diana is searching for a safe place to hide Peck, Marco uses his apartment (leading to a momentary awkwardness as he and Diana remember their brief relationship) as a base for Peck to write his newest script, although Peck is later compromised by "The Marked".

It is Marco who deduces the location of Jordan Collier's base in Seattle, before Collier reveals his "Promise City" to the US government.

When Marco's colleague uses his own promicin-induced ability, putting many of the principal "players" into a game of survival, the failed relationship between Marco and Diana is re-examined. Maia does not understand why Marco no longer visits them, and Marco admits to Diana that he does find it a little hard seeing her every day. Diana asks if he would be willing to give genuine friendship a try, and offers him an invitation to dinner with her and Maia.

After being infected by a promicin-inducing virus in "The Great Leap Forward", Marco can seemingly teleport to any place he is thinking of, as he appears in Promise City after looking at a photograph of the location.

=== Tess Doerner ===
Tess Doerner (Summer Glau) disappeared April 3, 1955.

Tess is first seen in the second-season premiere episode "Wake Up Call". She is a paranoid schizophrenic living in a psychiatric hospital. She has mentally taken control of the patients and staff at the hospital to undertake a task of building an unknown structure. Once completed, an attempt at powering up this unknown device seems to fail, until Tess's friend and protector Kevin Burkhoff speaks for the first time in six years; he has been "woken up" by the device and is revealed to be the probable "father" of 4400 technology.

Tess is later seen in the episode "The Ballad of Kevin and Tess", when Tom Baldwin and Diana Skouris are looking for Kevin. Tess claims not to have seen him; however, secretly she is keeping Kevin at her house, as he has mutated due to his promicin experiments. Tess has also been instructing Diana to come to her house using her abilities so that Kevin could inject her with promicin. After the events that follow, Kevin and Tess run off.

In the episode "Terrible Swift Sword", Jordan Collier receives help from 4400s with the ability to trace people to track Kevin and Tess and discovers where they are hiding; he then goes to visit them and enlists them in his plan to steal Dennis Ryland's stores of promicin.

She uses her ability to prevent Richard Tyler from destroying the entire supply of stolen promicin in the third-season finale "Fifty–Fifty".

In the fourth season premiere, Tess suffers a relapse into schizophrenia and begins "seeing" dead people. In the episode "Daddy's Little Girl", Tess's schizophrenia is finally cured by Shawn Farrell.

=== April Skouris ===
April (Natasha Gregson Wagner) is the artistic free-spirited sister of NTAC Agent Diana Skouris. When she was introduced she was the "black sheep of the family": unlucky, unmarried, steady job-less, and very untrustworthy. Maia, was briefly tricked into using her ability to choose lottery tickets and wager on sports for her "Aunt April". After this was discovered, Diana told April she was not allowed to see Maia and to come back one day when she is a better person.

Later in the series April returns with a handsome boyfriend named Ben and a successful job at her own tattoo shop. Although things seem up for her, things take a wrong turn. She proves to be unlucky in her relationship with Ben (Brennan Elliott), recently losing him to her sister, Diana.

April becomes depressed and coming to the realization that her life is pointless she takes a promicin shot, gaining the ability to make anyone truthfully answer any direct question she asks. She used this ability to make a living blackmailing people, and falls in love with a man named Colin. However, one of her "marks" is the vice president of a Fortune 500 company which paid for hitmen and was selling defective armor to the military. The "mark" has April's new boyfriend murdered.

Shocked, sad, and frightened at her loss and the new danger she is in, April returns to Diana for help and for a short time helps them uncover the killer using her ability. April uses her powers to expose the head of the corporation to NTAC, and is later employed by the federal government, using her powers in interrogations. She and Diana leave off on a more positive note than before.

=== Gary Navarro ===
Prior to his abduction (January 5, 1973), Gary Navarro (Sharif Atkins) only worried about baseball and getting to the Major Leagues. After his return, Gary hoped to continue his life's goal. Although NTAC Agent Tom Baldwin had promised to help him gain control his recently emerged telepathic abilities, Gary was swept up and made a spy for NTAC, an NSA agent, and eventually a member of the 4400 radical terrorist organization, Nova Group.

Gary was first used by NTAC to spy on the newly opened 4400 Center, reading the minds of Jordan Collier to dig up information. After he was uncovered as a spy, he was taken by the NSA to be used to find 4400s from hostile nations. His job was to eliminate them before they could be used as weapons. Finding out he'd been used to kill his own kind pushed Gary to then join Nova.

While working for Nova, Gary was captured when he attempted to murder Dennis Ryland. Agents loyal to Ryland subjected Gary to torture, including waterboarding, at the NTAC facility. When Tom Baldwin objected to his cruel punishment, NSA arranged to remove Navarro to another remote facility. Navarro was gladly freed in transit by the Nova group but after T.J. Kim's murder, Gary became dissatisfied with the Nova Group's operations and tired of the war, so he quit.

After a larger controversy where he escaped re-capture by NTAC thanks to Alana Mareva, Tom finally fulfilled his promise to Gary and helped him flee from the United States. Gary is currently a fugitive, reportedly in Canada.

=== Nikki Hudson ===
Nikki (Brooke Nevin) is the Farrells' neighbor and was Danny's girlfriend, until Shawn returned. Nikki and Shawn developed feelings for each other and dated until Shawn ran away to the 4400 Center. She returns later asking for Shawn's help curing her cancer-stricken father. They seem on the verge of renewing their relationship but Shawn calls it off, fearing that Isabelle will try to kill Nikki as an obstacle to her and Shawn's happiness.

=== Danny Farrell ===
Danny (Kaj-Erik Eriksen) is Shawn's younger brother who, because Shawn "stole" his girlfriend, is a staunch anti-4400 college student. Danny goes to the same college as Kyle. During season two, however, Matthew Ross suggested to Shawn that he should mend things with his family to help his image. Since then, Danny has healed his relationship with his older brother, though tensions still exist between the two.

The antagonistic relationship between the brothers flares up again in season four. Danny has felt that becoming a lawyer, in view of the powers possessed by promicin-positive individuals, has become pointless. In spite of his brother's advice, Danny wants to take promicin, and he mocks Shawn's warnings as fear that Shawn will no longer be the "special one". After realizing that taking promicin is Danny's own choice, Shawn gives a shot to him, but asks Danny to wait a few weeks to think it over.

In Tiny Machines, Danny, having heard about the test being developed by Kevin Burkhoff to determine whether or not an individual can tolerate promicin, approaches his brother at the 4400 Center. Though the test had not yet been completed, Burkhoff was able to predict, due to Danny's prominent Corpus callosum, that he would indeed survive if he took the shot. After doing so, Danny was unharmed - however during a visit home, in which he reveals that he is now "P-Positive" to his mother over drinks, the latter begins to exhibit signs of an aneurysm similar to those induced when individuals who can't tolerate promicin take the shot.

After many deaths, Danny realizes that his body is creating more promicin than it can contain and is involuntarily releasing it, infecting many. Much like the shots, the victims have a 50% chance of either surviving or acquiring a special ability. He eventually seeks Shawn's help and is put on the promicin inhibitor, but is left with an ultimatum: die from the buildup of promicin or get off the inhibitor and risk infecting others. Not wanting to kill anyone else, Danny forces Shawn to euthanize him. Meanwhile, the ensuing chaos of people being infected by promicin is used by Jordan Collier to bolster the support of his movement and take control of Seattle. Danny Farrell and Jordan Collier have the exact opposite ability.

=== Matthew Ross ===
Matthew Ross

Matthew (Garret Dillahunt) was a lobbyist in the Collier organization who advises Shawn after Jordan Collier's death. Matthew ran the day-to-day business of the 4400 Center and it is hinted Collier gave him specific instructions of what to do.

Early episodes in the third season suggested that Matthew knew more about the 4400 and Jordan Collier's assassination than he had revealed. When Isabelle Tyler was contemplating suicide, Ross told her she was nearly invulnerable, but offered her a syringe that he claimed would kill her. In a later episode, a similar toxin was given to Tom Baldwin from the future in order to neutralize Isabelle.

Matthew is later murdered by Isabelle when she inflicted an instantaneous stroke upon him. He had manipulated her for some time, and informed her that her purpose was to destroy the 4400. He implied that his loyalty lay with a faction from the future, one that opposed the 4400 project. This faction would be described to Tom Baldwin by the future people, and were described as cold and brutal in their methods.

In the fourth-season episode "The Marked", it is revealed through Curtis Peck's ability that Ross was among a ten-strong group of prominent individuals in society who have had their consciousness "hijacked" by the 4400-opposed faction. A side-effect of this operation leaves a mole underneath the subject's left earlobe, along with a vaguely X-shaped mark (hence the title of Curtis' Independent film and thus the episode). This mole is never actually visible in any scenes where Matthew was present, but it is explicitly revealed that he was the first known "Marked".

=== Heather Tobey ===
A school teacher, Heather (Kathryn Gordon) disappeared March 2, 1974. Her ability is to allow people to realize their full potential with regard to any special talent they may have. She unlocked artistic potential in several of her students. After several parents complained about their children being "altered", she quit. In the third season, she works at the 4400 Center's school. While taking the promicin inhibitor, her ability only worked on children, but without the inhibitor she can help adult 4400s focus their abilities, e.g., she helped Richard Tyler gain greater control over his telekinetic abilities.

She now works as an assistant to Shawn Farrell at the 4400 Center.

=== Cassie Dunleavy ===
Cassie Dunleavy (Tristin Leffler) is seemingly the physical manifestation of Kyle Baldwin's ability. She makes her first appearance in the fourth-season premiere, "The Wrath of Graham".

Cassie first approaches Kyle in a park where she poses as an art student. During the course of their conversation she suggests Kyle inject his cousin, Shawn Farrell, with promicin to snap him out of his coma. Kyle takes her advice and Shawn is awakened.

Kyle later returns to the park to tell Cassie what happened, but she is not there. He tries to track her down at the art school she mentioned, but no one has ever heard of her.

When he next sees Cassie (in "Fear Itself"), he confronts her with this information. She does not tell him who she really is but instead encourages him to enter a house whose owner maintains a makeshift museum devoted to the 1918 cult, the White Lights. Among the artifacts Kyle encounters there is a book that describes the coming of a messiah whose portrait physically resembles Jordan Collier. There is also mention of a healer and a shaman, whom Cassie later reveals as Shawn and Kyle, respectively. She also reveals in this episode that she is Kyle's ability, and only he can see her.

In "Audrey Parker's Come and Gone", Cassie instructs Kyle to steal the book describing the White Lights prophecies that he had read in the previous episode. Kyle does as she asks, leaving a $100 donation for the curator as compensation.

Cassie later appears while Kyle is reading the book to tell him to meet her at the intersection of Forbes and Shady at 2 a.m., "where it's all beginning". She warns him that if he doesn't show, he'll never see her again. Kyle does show up at the appointed time, and is there to witness a car crash that leads to the liberation of Isabelle Tyler, in transit to her new holding facility.

Later, in the episode entitled "Tiny Machines", Kyle finally begins to lose faith in the wisdom of Cassie's advice. When Isabelle, under the influence of the now-Marked Tom Baldwin, turns her back on the movement and kidnaps Jordan Collier, Kyle angrily accuses Cassie of deceiving and manipulating him. Her response indicates that Isabelle's betrayal was all part of a larger plan, and that in Jordan's absence it will fall on Kyle to assume leadership of Promise City. In the follow-up book, Promises Broken by David Mack, Kyle finally realizes that Cassie is not always looking out for his interests and was leading him in dark directions by sometimes speaking through him and even using him as her puppet. She is described as being "more than a little crazy, and she's got a mean streak".

=== The Marked ===
The Marked are a group of people belonging to the anti-4400 faction in the future, and they are first revealed in their eponymous episode. They consist of ten "elites" sent from the future, whose goal is to preserve the timeline as it originally proceeded and to stop the 4400 - in particular, Jordan Collier. The Marked have taken over the minds and bodies of prominent people in the present day, manipulating the world in total secrecy. Due to the procedure involved in the implantation, the Marked cannot develop powers by taking promicin. They are revealed to have an X-shaped mark behind the left earlobe, as described in 4400 Curtis Peck's trailer for his film The Marked, which would have unveiled the entire conspiracy.

The only explicitly revealed agents thus far are Drew Imroth, the CEO of the Ubient Software Corporation; Rebecca Parish, the director of National Intelligence; and Matthew Ross. It was Ross who primed The Marked's ultimate weapon Isabelle Tyler to destroy the 4400, although the plan faltered when she murdered him.

When Tom Baldwin is sectioned in a mental hospital for reporting Curtis Peck's claims of conspiracy, The Marked implant a sleeper agent inside him. Drew Imroth later reassures his comrades that when they need him, Baldwin will be there for them. After seeing numerous memories belonging to another person, Tom Baldwin is eventually overcome by the being formerly possessing Matthew Ross. Baldwin then uses his NTAC status to his advantage, capturing Isabelle Tyler and blackmailing her into taking back her abilities.

Following an attack on Ubient Software Corporation by a promicin-positive, the rest of The Marked have Drew Imroth kill his host so that he can be implanted into another host, Jordan Collier. Baldwin then forces Isabelle to kidnap Collier.

When Tom Baldwin is later freed from The Marked's control, he tries to rescue Collier, but is captured. However, Isabelle soon turns against The Marked, killing Rebecca Parish and freeing Baldwin and Collier at the cost of her own life. Baldwin, still retaining his memories of being one of The Marked, then gives Collier a list of the remaining seven.

Known members of The Marked include:

- Matthew Ross (deceased, agent transferred)
- NTAC agent Tom Baldwin (alive, agent deceased)
- Ubient CEO Drew Imroth (deceased, agent transferred)
- Jordan Collier (agent status unknown)
- National Intelligence agent Rebecca Parish (deceased, agent status unknown)

== Minor characters ==
=== Introduced in season 1 ===
Character	Actor	First seen	Status	Disappeared	Abilities	Notes
Orson Bailey	Michael Moriarty	S01E01	Alive	June 11, 1979 from Tacoma, Washington	Telekinesis-styled power, which took the form of "shaking" or vibrations, similar to a local, intense earthquake	Insurance Salesman and partner in Kensington & Bailey. After being returned, Bailey's emotional state, already dangerously chaotic, caused him to lose control of his power and suffer nosebleeds. Eventually this inability to control his power led to a man's death, and NTAC pursued Bailey and shot him during apprehension, but he lived.
Carl Morrissey	David Eigenberg	S01E02	Deceased	February 16, 2003 from Seattle, Washington	Enhanced strength and reflexes	A supermarket employee turned vigilante. Carl, upon discovering his powers, attempted to rid his neighbourhood of crime, drug use, vandalism and gang violence, and was stabbed and killed during one such venture, but inspired his neighbours to fight crime and continue to better the neighborhood.
Oliver Knox	Lee Tergesen	S01E03	Alive	August 22, 1983 from Friday Harbor, Washington	Mind control via speech	A serial killer. After returning, Knox began using his ability to make random people kill his victims for him, but NTAC eventually found out it was him and imprisoned Knox permanently in a soundproof cell at NTAC Seattle Headquarters.
Mary Deneville	Georgia Craig	S01E04	Deceased	August 4, 1999	Stimulate plant growth via speech	A florist and flower shop worker. After Oliver Knox's killing spree, the brothers of one of his victims went on a crusade against the 4400 and planted a bomb in Mary's flower delivery van, killing her in the resulting explosion.

=== Introduced in season 2 ===
Character	Actor	First seen	Status	Disappeared	Abilities	Notes
Agent Jed Garrity	Kavan Smith	S02E02	Alive		Self-replication	An NTAC agent who throughout the series is outspoken in his beliefs that the 4400 and other promicin positives should be treated as dangerous criminals. After becoming promicin-positive himself due to being infected by a promicin-inducing virus in "The Great Leap Forward", he creates a fully clothed, self-aware duplicate of himself.
Wendy Paulson	Lexa Doig	S02E03	Alive		None	A professor of 19th century novelas at the college Kyle begins attending, she expresses concern for his black-outs later on in the season telling Kyle to tell someone who can help him.
Devon Moore	Jody Thompson	S02E03	Deceased		None	An employee at the 4400 Center and one of Jordan Collier's many lovers. Devon was the first to take promicin after Collier stole Haspelcorp's supply. Devon's body rejected promicin and it killed her.
P.J.	Sean Devine	S02E03	Alive		Hallucination-created games	NTAC Theory Room Worker (incarcerated). P.J. worked with Marco and Brady in the Theory Room department of NTAC. When promicin hit the streets he wanted to be part of the movement to bring peace to the world so he took the shot. His ability trapped Tom, Megan Doyle, Diana, Maia, Shawn, Isabelle, Kyle, Jordan Collier, Marco, Brady and P.J. himself in a corrupt and locked down NTAC facility. There the group had to fight to escape by working together. In the end, the group succeeded and P.J. was arrested for his actions and for taking promicin; although his ability was shown to have helped bring Jordan Collier and Tom Baldwin a step closer to being friends.
Brady Wingate	Graeme Duffy	S02E03	Deceased		None	Works in the Theory Room department at NTAC with Marco Pacella and P.J. In "The Great Leap Forward", he dies after being infected with a promicin-inducing virus.
Trent Applebaum	Robert Picardo	S02E04	Alive	May 18, 1989	Saliva could induce increased metabolic rate	One of the original 4400. Due to his desperate financial situation, Trent marketed his ability, but it was later discovered that the rapid metabolic reactions couldn't be stopped when two affected people starved to death. NTAC was able to save others who were tested with the saliva when Trent gave his liver up for research.
Eric Papequash	Glen Gould	S02E04	Deceased		Unknown	Helped Richard and Lily Tyler hide during their evasion of Jordan Collier.
Billy	Noah Danby	S02E04	Alive		None	A tattoo parlour customer, who was warned by Maia to wear his helmet on his motorcycle.
Liv	Lindy Booth	S02E05	Alive		None	A homeless girl who Shawn invites to work at the center.
Jean DeLynn Baker	Sherilyn Fenn	S02E08	Deceased	October 27, 1999	Emit sub-atomic plague spores through sores on hands	One of the original 4400. When her power manifested during her sleep, wiping out her whole town's population, including her parents, her already unbalanced mind finally caused her to go insane from shock, and eventually regains her lucidity when she comes to believe her purpose is to purify humanity. Diana Skouris was forced to shoot her to keep her from wiping out Seattle's population.
Edwin (Musinga) Mayuya	Hill Harper	S02E09	Deceased	February 24, 1996 from Rwanda	Heal chromosome damage in utero	A nurse and wanted war criminal. One of the original 4400, he disappeared from an anti-Tutsi clinic. After his efforts to help infants were made public, he was identified as a wanted man for war crimes in Rwanda but was allowed to stay on the condition he kept healing. When it was discovered his gift was killing him (caused his own chromosomes to mutate and slowly destroy his body with developing heart disease and spinal irregularities), and faced with execution if he stopped healing, Edwin decided to keep using his ability for as long as his body allowed as penance for his crimes. Edwin died less than a year later.
TJ Kim	Leanne Adachi	S02E11	Deceased	February 2, 1998	Induce rage in men	One of the original 4400. T.J. became a firm anti-NTAC extremist after several disasters such as Jordan Collier's assassination and the promicin-inhibitor scandal, and eventually joined the newly formed Nova Group, and was captured for her efforts to assassinate Dennis Ryland. Boyd Gelder (using his ability to disguise himself as Tom Baldwin), later came to NTAC and shot T.J. twice in the head, killing her, to prevent her from revealing what she knew of the group to the authorities.
Roger Wolcott	Rob Lee	S02E11	Deceased	March 6, 1987	Unknown	One of the original 4400. Roger went into NTAC Seattle Headquarters for a checkup, and was restrained during T.J. Kim's terrorist attack, which had caused all the men in the facility to become homicidally violent. Roger was found by Major Charles Culp, and believing he was responsible for the attack (as he was affected by T.J.'s signal as well), Culp shot Roger in the heart, killing him.
Sarah James	Karen Austin	S02E11	Alive	November 5, 1971	Unknown	One of the original 4400.
Laurel Bryce	Iris Paluly	S02E11	Alive	January 7, 1982	Unknown	One of the original 4400.
Matthew Lombard	Ken Jones	S02E12	Alive	May 30, 1977	Unknown	One of the original 4400.
Rose Woodard	Christie Wilkes	S02E12	Alive	December 1, 1991	Unknown	One of the original 4400.
Werner Loecher	Nicholas von Zill	S02E12	Alive	April 19, 1973	Unknown	One of the original 4400.
Nate McCullough	Jonah Bay	S02E13	Alive	September 8, 2000	Unknown	One of the original 4400.

=== Introduced in season 3 ===
Character	Actor	First seen	Status	Disappeared	Abilities	Notes
Jung Pak	Phoenix Ly	S03E01	Alive	September 30, 1956	Can breathe underwater due to fish-like gills on his back	One of the original 4400.
Tyler Downing	Matthew Gray	S03E01	Alive	January 9, 1972	Control electricity	One of the original 4400. Can turn on and off electrical devices by altering electric currents (Electro-psychokinesis). Tyler was one of the 4400 children abducted by 'Sarah'.
Philippa Bynes	Angelique Naude	S03E01	Alive	May 11, 1994	Create light	One of the original 4400.
Dante Ferelli	Kurt Evans	S03E01	Alive	December 24, 1982	Unknown	One of the original 4400.
Wesley Hauser	Andrew Kavadas	S03E02	Deceased	1975	Unknown	One of the original 4400.
Daniel Armand	Ian Tracey	S03E02	Alive	July 20, 1990	Induce psychosis	Leader of the NOVA group. One of the original 4400. Daniel convinced Shawn to help create the Nova Group through funding as Shawn believed a defensive force of 4400's was needed after the promicin-inhibitor scandal. When Daniel resorted to terrorist means, Shawn became an enemy of the group and sold them out to NTAC. Daniel later sought vengeance against Shawn for his betrayal, and used his ability to make him schizophrenic. Isabelle Tyler hunted Daniel down as vengeance, and after forcing him to undo the damage, Isabelle turned Daniel's ability against himself, driving him insane.
Boyd Gelder	Sean Marquette	S03E03	Deceased	March 3, 2000	Imitation	A member of the NOVA group. One of the original 4400. After T.J. Kim's capture, Boyd volunteered for the mission to assassinate T.J. to prevent Nova's secret from falling into the authorities's hands and attempted to frame Tom Baldwin for the murder. Boyd was captured shortly after killing T.J., but was freed by Jordan Collier along with the rest of the group and assisted him in stealing Haspelcorp's supple of promicin, and later triggered a suicide bomb, which wiped out the original team of enhanced soldiers made by Haspelcorp, except Isabelle Tyler.
Ryan Freel	Matthew Harrison	S03E04	Alive	July 14, 1982	Unknown	A member of the NOVA group. One of the original 4400.
Amy Paspalis	Julia Tortolano	S03E04	Alive	July 23, 1999	Probability alteration	Center student and Maia Skouris's best friend. One of the original 4400.
Lindsey Hammond	Alexia Fast	S03E04	Alive	November 23, 1979	Oil in fingers alters glass	One of the original 4400. Lindsey was one of the 4400 children abducted by "Sarah" in the episode "Gone". In season 4, Lindsey returns as one of the promicin positives living in Promise City. There, she wishes Maia a happy birthday and gives her a special gift; her parents.
Olivia Germaine	Sophie Barnett	S03E04	Alive	April 2, 1964	Hydrokinesis	One of the original 4400. Her powers only work in the presence of her brother, Duncan. Olivia was one of the 4400 children abducted by "Sarah".
Duncan Germaine	Cainan Wiebe	S03E04	Alive	April 2, 1964	Hydrokinesis	One of the original 4400. His powers only work in the presence of his sister Olivia. Duncan was one of the 4400 children abducted by "Sarah".
Christopher Dubov	Kevin McNulty	S03E05	Alive	June 29, 1999	Pheromone detection	One of the original 4400. He matched people who smelled similar - he got his wife and dentist together. His son Michael, enraged that his mother had left, assaulted him.
Todd Barstow	Carter Jenkins	S03E06	Alive	August 29, 1995	Can see the past through another's emotional memories	One of the original 4400. In the memories he sees, he can see events, names, and even the feelings and thoughts of the people involved in that particular event. For his power to work, he must be conversing with the person. He told Alana the whereabouts of the man who killed her husband and son in a car accident.
Zachary Gilund	Danny Dorosh	S03E06	Alive	November 10, 1966	Unknown	A former member of the NOVA group. One of the original 4400. When NTAC began hunting for Daniel Armand after he caused Shawn Farrell to become schizophrenic, Zachary was frightened into leaving the group and told Richard Tyler the name and location of his Nova recruiter, Jane Nance, and later told Isabelle when confronted shortly after the meeting.
Jane Nance	Ulla Friis	S03E06	Deceased	October 17, 1980	Control animals	An owner of many pets and a member of the Nova Group. One of the original 4400. Isabelle killed Jane by turning her ability on herself, causing the animals she took care of to attack her, but not before Jane gave up Jorge Molina's name and location.
Jorge Molina	Emilio Salituro	S03E06	Deceased	March 24, 1975	Pyrokinesis	A gas station worker and a member of the Nova Group. One of the original 4400. Jorge was killed by Isabelle Tyler when she turned his ability on himself, causing him to make the station explode with him inside it, but not before giving up Daniel Armand's location.
Naomi Bonderman	Linda Darlow	S03E08	Alive	February 2, 1992	Induce hallucinations to resolve past problems	One of the original 4400. She secretes an oil from her hands that causes people to hallucinate figures from their past who they had strong ties to; the visions remaining until some closure is found. Her grandson used the oils to create "Blink", a street drug that caused three suicides and infected Tom and Diana. Naomi, who wears gloves to prevent the oil from touching people, helped NTAC to find the truth.
Darren Piersahl	Jamie Martz	S04E10	Deceased		Oxidation	A Sergeant in the US Army Rangers recruited into the enhanced-soldier program.
John Schaffner	J. August Richards	S04E10	Deceased		Unknown	A Staff Sergeant in the US Army Rangers recruited in the enhanced-soldier program.
Edwin Garrett		S03E10	Alive	October 8, 1980	Unknown	One of the original 4400. Attended Shawn Farrell's wedding.
Claudio Borghi	Brian George	S03E10	Alive	June 19, 1961	Induce precognitive visions	One of the original 4400. His ability is also biochemical - tobacco grown and touched by him imparted the visions to those who smoked it. Gave Shawn one of his cigars for a wedding gift.
Paul Newbold	Sean Pratt	S03E12	Alive	Unmentioned	Change body temperature	A member of the Nova Group. One of the original 4400.
Tina Richardson	Tanya Hubbard	S03E12	Alive	April 12, 1995	Telepathically erase memories	One of the original 4400. A member of the Nova Group.
Lewis Mesirow	Chris Davis	S03E12	Alive	April 19, 1955	Remote viewing	A member of the Nova Group. One of the original 4400. Lewis used his ability to help Jordan Collier find Kevin Burkhoff and Tess Doerner.
Michael Lawrence	Never seen	S03E12	Alive		Change oxygen level in bloodstream	4400 Center Student and Member of the Nova Group. Michael worshiped Jordan Collier after his resurrection, and gladly used his ability to free the Nova Group from NTAC Seattle Headquarters.
Unnamed woman	Never seen	S03E13	Alive		Cure neurodegenerative disease	A woman living in El Paso, Texas, who is the first recorded person to develop 4400 abilities from Collier's distribution of promicin. She cured her father who was living in a hospice of his Alzheimer's disease.

=== Introduced in season 4 ===
Character	Actor	First seen	Status	Disappeared	Abilities	Notes
Graham Holt	Cameron Bright	S04E01	Alive		Make himself worshiped	An unpopular high school student who took a promicin shot. When Graham became increasingly drunk on his new power and used it to take control of Seattle, Jordan Collier neutralized his ability.
Troy Kennedy	Tod Fennell	S04E02	Alive		Can play any instrument	An unemployed and lonely man who took a promicin shot. Troy was interrogated by NTAC about being the possible culprit behind the multiple phobia attacks around Seattle despite him explaining his true ability. Meghan Doyle later revealed he was innocent as another attack happened while he was in custody, and because he wasn't subjected to a promicin test, Troy was released.
Brandon Powell	Jake Cherry	S04E02	Alive		Exacerbate fears to phobic level	An autistic child who was given a promicin shot by his father, who wanted his son to have a normal childhood. He was cured by Shawn Farrell of his autism and put on the promicin inhibitor to control his ability. When he began taking the inhibitor, his previous victims showed signs of recovering their sanity. It is unclear whether they would relapse if he ceased to take the inhibitor.
Audrey Parker	Constance Towers and Laura Mennell	S04E03	Deceased		Astral projection	An old woman who took a promicin shot. She used her ability to feel emotionally alive again, and after her accidental murder by the son of her caretaker, Audrey helped NTAC solve her murder before fading away.
Senator Rolan Lenhoff	Kevin Tighe	S04E04	Alive		None	Suggested to Shawn to get into Seattle politics.
Shannon Reese	Lisa Sheridan	S04E05	Alive		Anxiety relief	A therapist who became a follower of Jordan Collier's teachings. Shannon helped Tom Baldwin temporarily work off the stress he suffered following Alana Mareva's re-abduction and Kyle's defection to Jordan Collier's movement.
Billy	Gregory Waldock	S04E05	Alive		Sonic screaming	A follower of Jordan Collier's teachings.
Dalton Gibbs	Jason Diablo	S04E05	Alive		Super-intelligence	A mechanic and electronics wizard who became a follower of Jordan Collier's teachings. Dalton used his new inventions to benefit Collier's movement, especially with his psychic defense beacons, which formed an effective defensive barrier around Promise City.
Kathy Weir	Iris Quinn	S04E05	Alive		Telekinesis	A follower of Jordan Collier's teachings.
Paul Weir	Mark Acheson	S04E05	Alive		Pyrokinesis	A follower of Jordan Collier's teachings.
Curtis Peck	Todd Giebenhain	S04E06	Deceased	May 9, 2001	Claircognisance	A film director. One of the original 4400. Curtis used his ability to use the films he made reveal the truth in many historical conspiracies (e.g. John F. Kennedy's assassination). Curtis later uncovered a conspiracy by future agents, known only as "The Marked", to stop the 4400. Curtis was later forced to go on the run from the Marked, but was later captured. But instead of being killed, Curtis agreed to deny the Marked's existence and stop revealing the truth behind historic conspiracies in exchange he would get to direct his own film in Hollywood. He was later tracked down by Diana Skouris and Meghan Doyle, to whom he revealed an important part of the puzzle - "The Marked" gain power over their hosts via nanotechnology injected into the spinal column. Shortly thereafter he is visited by the now "Marked" Tom Baldwin, interrogated, and murdered.
Anastasia	Andrew Rath	S04E07	Alive		Pollution clean-up	A follower of Jordan Collier's teachings.
Aquino	Curtis Caravaggio	S04E07	Alive		Invisibility	A Captain in the US Army recruited into the enhanced-soldier program. Aquino led a team of 5 enhanced soldiers (including himself) to assassinate Jordan Collier after he seized part of Seattle as the foundation of the new "Promise City", but because of a tip from Maia Skouris, Aquino and his men were captured by Collier, and after refusing to join him, had their abilities removed and were safely escorted out of city.
Henderson		S04E07	Alive		Tracking via scent	A member of the US Army recruited into the enhanced-soldier program and later assigned to Aquino's team. Ability removed by Jordan Collier.
Unnamed Enhanced Soldier		S04E07	Alive		Psychic attacks	A member of the US Army recruited into the enhanced-soldier program and later assigned to Aquino's team. Ability removed by Jordan Collier.
Cora Tomkins	Lorena Gale	S04E09	Alive	November 2, 1950	Age alteration	One of the original 4400. Creates a liquid that, when mixed with water, makes whoever drinks it progressively younger. With the instruction of Richard, she used her ability to make Isabelle a baby again. In recent events she seems to have reversed what she had done and returned Isabelle to her original age.
Michael Ancelet	Martin Sims	S04E10	Alive		Information retention	A 4400 who used to work the 4400 Center security with Richard. When NTAC came looking for Richard, Jordan gave agents Tom Baldwin and Diana Skouris Michael's name and location in the hopes they could track Richard down. NTAC met Michael at his home and threatened him by saying that they would arrest him and wouldn't allow him to write down all his thoughts building up in his head; which would eventually make him go insane. Michael then reluctantly revealed Richard's hiding place.
Byron Lillibridge	Greyston Holt	S04E10	Alive	February 28, 1966	Projection of others	One of the original 4400. He helped Kyle try to find Isabelle, by using his ability to create a seemingly real projection of Lily Tyler which fooled Richard completely. "Lily" convinced Richard to change Isabelle back, which was what Kyle also hoped Byron would be able to achieve.

== List of The 4400 ==
Character	Portrayed by	First appearance	Abduction date	Abilities	Immediate effect	NTAC's ripple effect theory	Status	Notes
Jordan Collier	Billy Campbell	S01E03	April 10, 2002	Ability neutralization				dies and is resurrected
Shawn Farrell	Patrick Flueger	S01E01	April 22, 2001	Life manipulation				
Alana Mareva	Karina Lombard	S02E07	September 5, 2001	Alternate reality projection	Used her ability to take Tom to an alternate reality in which the two of them were married. They stayed for 8 years.	Stabilizing influence in Tom Baldwin's life	Retaken by the people from the future	Stay together in real world, though not married
Maia Skouris	Conchita Campbell	S01E01	March 3, 1946	Precognition				Adopted by Diana Skouris
Lily Tyler	Laura Allen	S01E01	May 26, 1993	Age control			Died	
Richard Tyler	Mahershalalhashbaz Ali	S01E01	May 11, 1951	Telekinesis				Dated Lily Moore's grandmother
Orson Bailey	Michael Moriarty	S01E01	June 11, 1979	Shockwave emission		Kensington-Bailey fraud revealed	Institutionalized	
Carl Morrissey	David Eigenberg	S01E03	February 16, 2003	Physical enhancement	Neighbourhood vigilante	Neighbourhood watch formed	Killed	
Oliver Knox	Lee Tergesen	S01E04	August 22, 1983	Vocal persuasion	Caused serial killing	One of the victims' brother planted bombs targeting the 4400s	Incarcerated	
Mary Deneville	Georgia Craig	S01E05	August 4, 1999	Plant control			Killed	
Tess Doerner	Summer Glau	S02E01	April 3, 1955	Mind control	Causes a psychiatric hospital to be compelled to build some kind of beacon	Woke up neural scientist specialising in dormant neural passageways		
Gary Navarro	Sharif Atkins	S02E02	January 5, 1973	Telepathy	Exposes bad plans at 4400 centre		In hiding, reportedly in Canada	
Heather Tobey	Kathryn Gordon	S02E05	March 2, 1974	Potential realization	Causes her class to all excel at different skills. One student doesn't get a skill and holds a gun to her	Agent Skouris suggests she might hire Heather to teach Maia piano or art, agent Baldwin suggests that could be a ripple effect	Leaves for another school. In S3, works at 4400 Centre.	
Trent Appelbaum	Robert Picardo	S02E04	May 18, 1989	Rapid metabolism acceleration	Causes 2 deaths and 100 people to almost die	The proteins in his saliva that cause the ability can be used to advance many areas of science dramatically.		
Eric Papequash	Glen Gould	S02E04	August 5, 1955	Unknown				
Jean DeLynn Baker	Sherilyn Fenn	S02E08	October 27, 1999	Plague spores	Killed her entire village		Killed	
Edwin Musinga/Mayuya	Hill Harper	S02E09	February 24, 1996	Repair damaged chromosomes (At cost of his own)	Saves 4 infants			Scandal in his past revealed
Roger Wolcott	Rob Lee	S02E11	March 6, 1987				Killed	
Sara James	Karen Austin	S02E11	November 5, 1971					
Laurel Bryce	Iris Paluly	S02E11	January 7, 1982					
T.J. Kim	Leanne Adachi	S02E11	February 2, 1998	Produce microwaves, radiowaves and soundwaves	Infiltrates NTAC, causing all the males to have their fight or flight reflexes intensified dramatically, causing chaos.		Killed	
Rose Woodard	Christie Wilkes	S02E12	December 1991					
Matthew Lombard	Ken Jones	S02E12	May 30, 1977					
Werner Loecher	Nicholas von Zill	S02E12	April 19, 1973					
Nate McCullough	Jonah Bay	S02E13	September 8, 2000					
Jung Pak	Phoenix Ly	S03E01	September 30, 1956	Underwater breathing				
Tyler Downing	Matthew Gray	S03E01	January 9, 1972	Electrokinesis				
Philippa Bynes	Angelique Naude	S03E01	May 11, 1994	Bioluminescence				
Dante Ferelli	Kurt Evans	S03E01	December 24, 1982					
Wesley Hauser	Andrew Kavadas	S03E01	1975					
Daniel Armand	Ian Tracey	S03E01	July 20, 1990	Psychosis induction				
Boyd Gelder	Sean Marquette	S03E03	March 3, 2000	Optical camouflage			Imprisoned	
Ryan Freel	Matthew Harrison	S03E04	July 14, 1982					
Amy Paspalis	Julia Tortolano	S03E04	July 23, 1999	Probability alteration				
Lindsey Hammond	Alexia Fast	S03E04	November 23, 1979	Glass-altering oil				
Olivia Germaine	Sophie Barnett	S03E04	April 2, 1964	Water manipulation				
Duncan Germaine	Cainan Wiebe	S03E04	April 2, 1964	Water manipulation				
Christopher Dubov	Kevin McNulty	S03E05	June 29, 1999	Pheromone smelling				
Todd Barstow	Carter Jenkins	S03E06	August 29, 1995	See events and feelings from past	Tells Alana who killed her husband and son.			
Zachary Gidlund	Danny Dorosh	S03E06	November 10, 1966					
Jane Nance	Ulla Friis	S03E06	October 17, 1980	Animal control			Killed	
Jorge Molina	Emilio Salituro	S03E06	March 24, 1975	Pyrokinesis			Killed	
Naomi Bonderman	Linda Darlow	S03E08	February 2, 1992	Produce hallucinations for resolving past problems	Helps resolves problems from Tom and Diana's past.			
Claudio Borghi	Brian George	S03E10	June 19, 1961	Precognitive visions induction				
Edwin Garrett		S03E10	October 8, 1980					
Michael Lawrence		S03E12		Human's bloodstream oxygen alteration				
Paul Newbold	Sean Pratt	S03E12		Body temperature alteration				
Tina Richardson	Tanya Hubbard	S03E12	April 12, 1995	Memory erasure				
Lewis Mesirow	Chris Davis	S03E12	April 19, 1955	Remote viewing				
Curtis Peck	Todd Giebenhain		May 9, 2001	Claircognizance				
Cora Tomkins	Lorena Gale		November 2, 1950	Rejuvenation liquid secretion				
Michael Ancelet	Martin Sims	S04E09		Eidetic memory				
Byron Lillibridge	Greyston Holt	S04E10	February 28, 1966	Cause someone to see and hear people whether dead or alive				
