= Joel Gretsch =

American actor

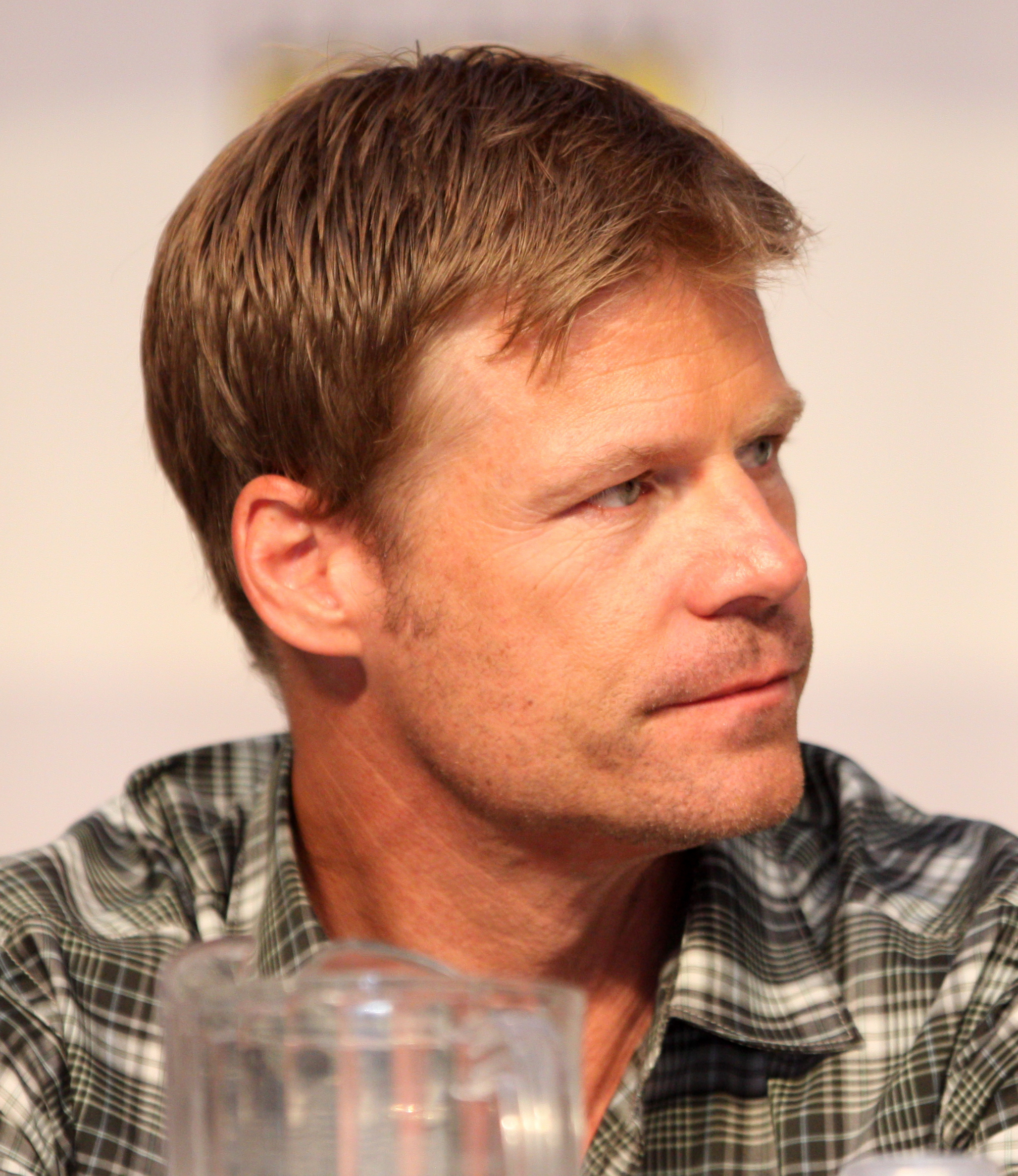
- Gretsch at the 2010 San Diego Comic-Con
- Born: December 20, 1963 (age 62); St. Cloud, Minnesota, U.S.
- Occupation: Actor
- Years active: 1992–present
- Spouse: Melanie Shatner (m. 1999)
- Children: 2
- Relatives: William Shatner (father-in-law)

Joel Gretsch (born December 20, 1963) is an American actor. His credits include The 4400 (2004–2007), Taken (2002), V (2009–2011), Friends (1995), Saved by the Bell: The New Class (1994), JAG (1999), Silk Stalkings, CSI: Miami, CSI: NY, Burn Notice, NCIS, Law & Order: Criminal Intent, Journeyman, The Legend of Bagger Vance (2000), Minority Report (2002), The Emperor's Club (2002), National Treasure: Book of Secrets (2007), The Vampire Diaries (2016–2017), and All Rise (2020).

== Early life ==
Gretsch was born in St. Cloud, Minnesota, and grew up in Albany, Minnesota, the son of Russ and Barb. He has a sister, Jane, and a brother, Steve. Gretsch was raised Roman Catholic.

== Career ==
Gretsch studied acting at the Guthrie Theater in Minneapolis before moving to Los Angeles in 1989. His stage work includes roles in Molière's Tartuffe and John Patrick Shanley's Danny and the Deep Blue Sea.

He started his television work in the early 1990s, appearing in episodes of Married... with Children, Melrose Place, Friends and Saved by the Bell: The New Class. Since then he has appeared in episodes of JAG, Silk Stalkings, CSI: Miami, CSI: NY, Burn Notice, and NCIS. In 2006, he played a wealthy advertising executive and husband of a supermodel on an episode of Law & Order: Criminal Intent. In 2007, had two guest appearances playing the father of protagonist Dan Vasser on NBC's Journeyman.

Gretsch has also had supporting roles in a number of films including playing Bobby Jones in The Legend of Bagger Vance (2000), Minority Report (2002), The Emperor's Club (2002) and National Treasure: Book of Secrets (2007).

In 2008, Gretsch had a recurring role as Pete Raynor, Lindsay Boxer's love interest, on the television series Women's Murder Club.

Some of his notable roles include Tom Baldwin on the USA Network series The 4400 in which he starred alongside actress Jacqueline McKenzie, and as Owen Crawford in Steven Spielberg's 2002 science fiction miniseries Taken. Gretsch reunited with Scott Peters (creator of The 4400) on his remake of V. Gretsch played priest and resistance fighter Father Jack Landry in the series.

In 2009, he guest starred in the Diablo Cody created Emmy Award nominated Showtime Comedy-Drama The United States of Tara.

== Personal life ==
Gretsch has been married to actress Melanie Shatner since September 5, 1999. They have two daughters: Kaya (born 2002), and Willow (born July 29, 2005).

== Filmography ==
=== Film ===
Year	Title	Role	Notes
1999	Kate's Addiction	Jack	
2000	The Legend of Bagger Vance	Bobby Jones	
2001	Jane Bond	Handsome Man	Short
2002	Minority Report	Donald Dubin	
2002	The Emperor's Club	Older Sedgewick Bell	
2006	Glass House: The Good Mother	Raymond Goode	Video
2007	National Treasure: Book of Secrets	Thomas Gates	
2009	Shrink	Evan	
2009	Saving Grace B. Jones	Dan Jones	
2009	Push	Jonah Gant	
2011	Commerce	Ken	Short
2013	Are You Here	"Red" Coulter	
2015	Safelight	Mr. Sullivan	
2015	Silent War	Shae's Father	Short
2017	Dead Trigger	General Conlan	
2023	Air	John O'Neil	

=== Television ===
Year	Title	Role	Notes
1993	Married... with Children	Johnny	Episode: "It Doesn't Get Any Better Than This"
1994	Saved by the Bell: The New Class	Tony Hartley	Episode: "Tommy the Tenor"
1994	Melrose Place	Mitch Sheridan	Episode: "No Strings Attached"
1994	Family Album	John	TV miniseries
1995	Friends	Fireman Ed	Episode: "The One with the Candy Hearts"
1995	The Bold and the Beautiful	Ramone	2 episodes
1997	Renegade	Chris	Episode: "SWM Seeks Vctm"
1999	JAG	Chief Hodge	Episode: "Silent Service"
1999	Silk Stalkings	Rusty	Episode: "Where and When"
1999	Pacific Blue	Mark Lewis	Episode: "Trust"
2000	Beyond Belief: Fact or Fiction	Dan	Episode: "One for the Road"
2002	Taken	Colonel Owen Crawford	TV miniseries
2003	CSI: Miami	John Walker	Episode: "Death Grip"
2003, 2012–2013, 2015	NCIS	NCIS Special Agent Stan Burley	Episodes: "High Seas", "Playing with Fire", "Squall", "Saviors"
2004–2007	The 4400	Tom Baldwin	Main role
2006	CSI: NY	Dr. Keith Beaumont	Episode: "Live or Let Die"
2006	Law & Order: Criminal Intent	Jason Raines	Episode: "Siren Call"
2007	Journeyman	Frank Vasser	Episodes: "The Legend of Dylan McCleen", "Home by Another Way"
2008	Women's Murder Club	Pete Raynor	Recurring role
2009	Burn Notice	Scott Chandler	Episode: "Seek and Destroy"
2009	United States of Tara	Dr. Holden	Episodes: "Snow", "Miracle"
2009–2011	V	Father Jack Landry	Main role
2011	In Plain Sight	Major Lucas Provo	Episode: "Provo-Cation"
2011	The Playboy Club	Jimmy Wallace	Episodes: "Trouble in Makeoutsville", "A Matter of Simple Duplicity"
2013	The Client List	Ranger Captain Reese	Episodes: "Wild Nights Are Calling", "What Kind of Fool Do You Think I Am"
2013–2014	Witches of East End	Victor	Recurring role
2014	Caper	Sam Clarke	Episodes: "City of Angels", "Psycho Path", "Southpaw's Always Right"
2014	Zodiac: Signs of the Apocalypse	Professor Neil Martin	TV film
2014	Scorpion	Governor Paul Lane	Episode: "Single Point of Failure"
2014	Agents of S.H.I.E.L.D.	Hank Thompson	Episode: "The Writing on the Wall"
2015	Criminal Minds	Sheriff Paul Desario	Episode: "Pariahville"
2016–2017	The Vampire Diaries	Peter Maxwell	Recurring role (season 8)
2018	Do Unto Others	Pastor Adler	TV film
2018	A Father's Nightmare	Matt Carmichael	TV film
2020	All Rise	Frank Frost	2 episodes
