= Craig Sweeny =

American screenwriter and producer

Craig Sweeny is an American television producer and screenwriter, best known for his work on The 4400, Medium, and Elementary. He also created the series Limitless, The Code, and Watson.

Additionally, he has also written for television series such as Dr. Vegas and Star Trek: Discovery. In 2021, he struck a new overall deal with CBS Studios.

Sweeny trains regularly in Brazilian jiu-jitsu. His production company is Action This Day!

== Filmography ==
Year	Title	Writer	Executive Producer	Creator	Notes
2003	Playmakers	Yes	No	No	2 episodes
2004	Dr. Vegas	Yes	No	No	2 episodes
2004–2007	The 4400	Yes	No	No	Wrote 18 episodes (Also producer)
2005–2011	Medium	Yes	Yes	No	Wrote 22 episodes
2012	Common Law	Yes	Yes	No	Wrote 4 episodes
2012–2017	Elementary	Yes	Yes	No	Wrote 16 episodes
2015–2016	Limitless	Yes	Yes	Developer	Wrote 5 episodes
2017–2018	Star Trek: Discovery	Yes	No	No	Wrote episode "Context Is for Kings" (Also consulting producer)
2019	The Code	Yes	Yes	Yes	Wrote 3 episodes
2025	Star Trek: Section 31	Yes	Yes	No	TV movie
2025–2026	Watson	Yes	Yes	Yes	Wrote 5 episodes
