= Scott Peters (writer) =

Canadian screenwriter

Scott Peters is a Canadian television producer, television director and screenwriter, most probably known for his involvement in writing, co-creating and producing for the science fiction television series The 4400. He is also the head writer of the 2009 sci-fi series V, a remake of the 1980s sci-fi miniseries originally created by Kenneth Johnson. Peters is also credited as Executive Producer for the series.

== Filmography ==
- 4400 (1 episode) (2022)
- Batwoman, director (1 episode) (2019)
- Marvel's Runaways, director (1 episode) (2018)
- The Gifted, director (3 episodes) and writer (2017–2019)
- V, developed by and head writer (2009–2011)
- The 4400, creator, writer and director (2004–2007)
- The Outer Limits, writer (1999–2000)
