= The Price Is Right models =

Models featured on the American game show The Price Is Right

Since its 1972 relaunch, the American television game show The Price Is Right has featured a number of models who present the prizes and items offered on the show. From 1972 to 2007, these models were popularly referred to as "Barker's Beauties" in reference to Bob Barker, the show's host during that period.

== History ==
=== 1956–1965 ===
The original Price Is Right also employed models. Typically, two models appeared per episode to present the prizes, following a format similar to later versions. As in the current version hosted by Drew Carey, the models were not collectively referred to by a nickname.

June Ferguson and Toni Wallace were the primary models and remained with the show throughout its nine-year run. Other models occasionally assisted or filled in during their absences. Ann Macomber Cullen (wife of host Bill Cullen) occasionally appeared to present prizes, sometimes to the host's surprise.

=== 1972–2008 ===
==== Early lineup and expansion (1972–1983) ====
Over 25 women have appeared as models on The Price Is Right since the program's premiere. For the first three years, there were two models: Janice Pennington and Anitra Ford. Dian Parkinson joined them permanently in 1975 after making occasional appearances.

Ford left the program in 1976 and was later replaced by Holly Hallstrom, who joined in 1977. Pennington, Parkinson, and Hallstrom served as the three main models on both the daytime and syndicated versions from 1977 to 1990. Host Bob Barker had a direct role in selecting the models, which by 2002 was his only staffing responsibility. In an interview on Larry King Live, he described the qualities he looked for, including physical beauty and the ability to present prizes in a way that would appeal to the home viewer. A slender figure was not a strict requirement. Barker noted that if it had been, Hallstrom would have been dismissed much earlier.

==== Rotation and return (1983–1990) ====
Hallstrom temporarily left in 1983 to pursue an acting career. During her absence, several women filled the third model position alongside Pennington and Parkinson during season 12. These included Andi Rapagna, who later modeled for the Italian version of the show OK, il prezzo è giusto!, Janice Baker from the NBC version of Card Sharks, and Pat Colbert, who was the first African American woman to appear on the daytime version, although not in a permanent capacity. Hallstrom returned in 1984.

In December 1990, Pennington, Parkinson, and Hallstrom were joined by Kathleen Bradley, the first permanent African American model on the show. Kyle Aletter, the daughter of Frank Aletter and Lee Meriwether, often substituted when a regular model was unavailable.

==== Departures and legal disputes (1993–1999) ====
Parkinson left the show in 1993, with Barker stating that she did so to pursue other interests. Some speculated her departure was due to ongoing issues with Pennington. In 1994, Parkinson filed a lawsuit accusing Barker of sexual harassment dating back to the 1980s, which she later withdrew in 1995.

She was succeeded by several other models, including Cindy Margolis, until Gena Lee Nolin was hired in 1994. In 1995, Hallstrom was dismissed by Barker and Jonathan Goodson as part of a decision to reduce the number of models. Hallstrom claimed she was let go because she refused to support Barker during his legal dispute with Parkinson. Barker sued Hallstrom for slander and libel, and she countersued for wrongful termination, as well as age, weight, and medical discrimination. Hallstrom received a multimillion-dollar settlement in 2005.

After Nolin left in 1995, Chantel Dubay joined as the third model in 1996. She remained until 1999 and was succeeded by Nikki Ziering.

==== Production changes and further lawsuits (2000–2003) ====
In 2000, Pennington and Bradley were dismissed following the show's acquisition by Pearson Television. Their departures occurred shortly after Barker's failed legal action against Hallstrom. Both filed wrongful termination claims and later settled out of court. Pennington later said she held no ill will toward Barker, though they rarely spoke afterward. Bradley suggested that both she and Pennington had been dismissed for providing testimony in the Hallstrom and Parkinson lawsuits. Barker stated in 2002 that he was proud of Pennington for defending him and said that Pearson, not he, had made the decision to let them go. Bradley also expressed dissatisfaction with the pay she received on the show.

Heather Kozar and Claudia Jordan were hired in 2001 to replace Pennington and Bradley. Ziering and Kozar left in 2002. Jordan remained as the only permanent model and was joined by a rotating group of others.

Jordan left in 2003 after filing a complaint about racial discrimination. She later filed a lawsuit for wrongful termination and racial bias, and received an out-of-court settlement.

==== Model rotation format (2003–2008) ====
Following Jordan's departure, the show discontinued the use of a fixed model lineup. Instead, models rotated every few weeks. Some eventually joined the regular cast, while others appeared for a single taping block. This format remained in place until 2008, when new contractual changes were introduced.

=== Since 2008 ===
==== Return to permanent model format ====
In season 37, beginning in September 2008, executive producer Mike Richards introduced contract changes that allowed the show to return to a format with five permanent models. The initial lineup included four holdovers from the previous rotation: Rachel Reynolds, Gwendolyn Osborne-Smith, Lanisha Cole, and Brandi Sherwood. Two new models were added to the cast: Amber Lancaster and Manuela Arbeláez. Manuela originally joined as a substitute during Brandi's maternity leave and became permanent after Brandi was dismissed.

Models are now referred to as "The Price Is Right models" in public appearances with host Drew Carey. Beginning in December 2009, they were listed in the show's full end credits. Starting with the 2010–11 season, the models began using microphones so they could be heard when interacting with Carey or contestants. When only two models are present during prize presentations that typically involve three, the announcer often serves as the third. In early season 52, some episodes featured only one model due to emergency circumstances.

==== New responsibilities and male model inclusion ====
Since 2012, the models have taken on expanded roles. On the show's website, they began appearing in interviews and behind-the-scenes content. They also participated in a web series called Male Model Search, serving as judges in both the 2012 and 2014 editions.

In 2014, former Miss USA Shanna Moakler served as one of the celebrity judges during the male model search. She joined the regular models and producers including Richards, along with Robert Scott Wilson, the show's first male model.

==== Current lineup ====
As of 2026, the show features seven permanent models: Rachel Reynolds, Amber Lancaster, Manuela Arbeláez, James O'Halloran, Devin Goda, Alexis Gaube, and George Gray. Each episode typically includes two or three models. Occasionally, only one model appears, such as during guest appearances by personalities affiliated with Paramount Global or when travel and health logistics limit availability. Some season 52 episodes included only James for this reason. Beginning in Season 55, in order to lower production costs, only one model per show is used with George Gray serving as the models’ assistant.

=== Nighttime versions ===
The daytime models appeared on the 1970s syndicated nighttime version as well, with a few notable exceptions. Additional models besides Parkinson were also featured on the nighttime show, including Janice's sister Ann Pennington and a black model known only by her first name, Harriet.

On the 1985 syndicated version, Pennington, Parkinson, and Hallstrom appeared throughout the run. However, on the 1994 syndicated version, an entirely separate cast of models was featured: Julie Lynn Cialini, Ferrari Farris, and Lisa Stahl Sullivan.

Since the premiere of the CBS prime time series in 2002, there are often situations where four to seven models appear on each episode. All six of the regular daytime models participate, although not in every episode.

Ashley Callingbull serves as the lead model of the Canadian spin-off The Price Is Right Tonight.

== List of models ==
Name	Debut	Departure	Notes
Kyle Aletter	1984	1996	Substitute model
Manuela Arbeláez	2008	Present	Second Hispanic model; participated in 2008 model search; joined cast during Brandi Sherwood's pregnancy.
Janice Baker	1983	1984	Substitute model during Season 12. Was a card dealer on the 1978–1981 version of Card Sharks (another Goodson-Todman production).
Kathleen Bradley	1990	2000	First permanent African American model on the daytime show.
Paige Brooks	2001	2002	
Starr Campbell	2004	2005	
Lanisha Cole	2003	2010	Later appeared as a model on Deal or No Deal from March to September 2006.
Phire Dawson	2005	2008	
Trish Dowley	2003	2003	Veteran producer.
Chantel Dubay	1996	1999	
Jennifer England	2002	2003	
Anitra Ford	1972	1976	
Alexis Gaube	2021	Present	Was a card dealer on the 2019–2021 version of Card Sharks (as was the case with Janice Baker on the 1978–1981 version).
George Gray	2016	Present	Also server as announcer. Became the residential model in 2026 as a result of the one model per show rule.
Devin Goda	2018	Present	Third permanent male model to be on the American version of the show; played in the NFL in 2012.
Daniel Goddard	2012	2019	Substitute model, Cane Ashby on The Young and the Restless
Elizabeth Gutiérrez	2005	2005	First Hispanic model.
Lisa Gleave	2002	2003	Later appeared as a model on Deal or No Deal from December 2005 to May 2009.
Teri Harrison	2003	2005	
Holly Hallstrom	1977	1995	Left in 1983 for an acting career, returned in 1984. Was fired in October 1995 allegedly for weight gain, resulting in being in a number of lawsuits with host Bob Barker, with the final one settled in October 2005.
Claudia Jordan	2001	2003	Later appeared as a model on Deal or No Deal from December 2005 to May 2009.
Lexie Karlsen	2001	2001	
Heather Kozar	2001	2002	
Amber Lancaster	2008	Present	First of the "permanent" Carey era models when show switched to five rotating models in 2009.
Cindy Margolis	1995	1996	Substitute model
Tamiko Nash	2007	2009	
Gena Lee Nolin	1994	1995	
James O'Halloran	2014	Present	Second permanent male model to be on the American version of the show; won the 2014 model search.
Melissa Ordway	2013	2021	Substitute model; Abby Newman on The Young and the Restless
Gwendolyn Osborne	2005	2017	Then-husband and son appeared to model prizes on selected shows; first to announce her pregnancy on air.
Dian Parkinson	1975	1993	Filed a lawsuit against host Bob Barker for sexual harassment in 1994, she would withdraw the suit in 1995.
Janice Pennington	1972	2000	Longest-serving model in the show's history; one of two to have appeared over 20 years.
Rebecca Mary Pribonic	2004	2006	
Andi Rapagna	1983	1984	Substitute model during season 12. Would later go on to model for the Italian version of the show OK, il prezzo è giusto!
Rachel Reynolds	2003	Present	Lead Price is Right model; longest-serving current and second-longest serving all-time model on the show (one of two with over 20 years); also the last remaining current model from the Bob Barker era; husband and daughter have been guest models for various prizes; in one instance, a prize displayed her sonogram announcing her pregnancy.
Brandi Sherwood	2002	2009	Dismissed February 23, 2010; later filed lawsuit against FremantleMedia/RTL Group and CBS.
Amanda Shiflett	2009	2009	Won model search contest
Shane Stirling	2002	2008	
Gabrielle Tuite	2003	2008	
Rob Wilson	2012	2014	First permanent male model to be on the American version of the show; won the 2012 model search.
Natasha Yi	2005	2006	First Asian American model
Nikki Zeno	2005	2005	She was the second Latina Model to appear on the series, appearing in 10 episodes.
Nikki Ziering	1999	2002	

== Guest models ==
In February 2006, Tyra Banks appeared as a guest model during two games to promote her daytime talk show.

Since Drew Carey became host in 2007, celebrities and sports figures have frequently appeared in themed segments to help present prizes related to their professions. Notable guests have included Wayne Newton, Lou Ferrigno, Reba McEntire, Jim Nantz, Heidi Newfield, the United States women's national soccer team, Chuck Finley, James Corden, Edwin Aldrin, Jr., Carl Edwards, Kit Hoover, John McCook, Natalie Morales, Jake Paul, Katie Stam, Blake Shelton, Bomshel, and WWE Divas Kelly Kelly and the Bella Twins.

Starting in season 37, manufacturers began sending representatives to present products during prize segments. These guests often include athletes affiliated with a brand, musicians endorsed by an instrument manufacturer, or corporate spokespeople. They primarily appear during One Bid segments, but sometimes participate in the Showcase as well. Carey typically introduces the guest and their connection to the product, and often there is a live question-and-answer session with the guest.

In 2009 and 2010, Kathy Kinney appeared on April Fool's Day episodes as her character Mimi Bobeck from The Drew Carey Show. In 2009, she modeled prizes, and in 2010, she was featured as the show's executive producer, with the models trading places with three male staff members.

The show has also featured crossover appearances from CBS or Fremantle-affiliated series, including actors from The Late Late Show with Craig Ferguson, The Amazing Race, Survivor, Let's Make a Deal, The Bold and the Beautiful, and The Young and the Restless. Tiffany Coyne of Let's Make a Deal appeared as a fifth model in several episodes in March 2011. Daniel Goddard, who played Cane Ashby on The Young and the Restless, has also appeared regularly to model prizes, especially when a masculine theme is involved. His appearances helped normalize the use of male models on the show.

In season 40, Rachel Reynolds and her husband David Delucci, a former Major League Baseball player, modeled wedding formal wear.

A special Mother's Day episode on May 11, 2012, featured themed guests. Florence Henderson appeared alongside personal trainer Johannes Brugger, who became the show's first male guest model not associated with a crossover or brand. Also featured were analyst Kenny Smith and his son Malloy, who is married to show model Gwendolyn Osborne; their segment included a pregnancy announcement.

In spring 2014, ballroom dancer Cheryl Burke, who partnered with Carey on Dancing with the Stars, appeared in several episodes and presented prizes.

During Dream Car Week, the show has featured guests tied to the automotive industry. Jay Leno modeled cars in 2019, and Kurt Busch (who modeled in his full 2019 series firesuit) did the same in 2020.

== Announcer ==
The announcer models prizes such as men's watches, suits, and other accessories, a practice that began with original announcer Johnny Olson and has continued with his three successors (Rod Roddy, Rich Fields, and George Gray), although with the addition of permanent male models to meet the show's traditional female demographic it has been greatly reduced. The announcer also appeared in Showcase skits, sometimes modeling the prizes or playing a character in a story line. Starting in 2010, on episodes where two models appear in games typically featuring three models, the announcer will assume the third model's role and often is paired with another model when describing prizes. Following a set change in 2011 featuring a video screen to the announcer's podium, some prizes, graphics for trips, or smaller items are displayed or modeled by the announcer from his podium.

== Conflicts ==
=== With Barker ===
In addition to widely reported lawsuits, several other staff members also filed legal claims against Bob Barker and the production, alleging sexual harassment and wrongful termination. After Dian Parkinson accused Barker of sexual harassment, he held a press conference and admitted to a past consensual relationship with her.

In a 2007 interview with USA Today, Barker commented on his experiences with four longtime models—Bradley, Hallstrom, Parkinson, and Pennington. While largely keeping his comments on Pennington diplomatic (he remarked that that she showed bravery in the disappearance and death of her husband Fritz Stammberger), he spoke harshly of the others: "They've been such a problem. I don't want to say anything about them. They're disgusting; I don't want to mention them." He praised the newer rotating models as "the best models we've ever had."

All lawsuits, except for Hallstrom's, were settled out of court. Barker dropped his slander suit against Hallstrom, who countersued and received a multimillion-dollar settlement. Hallstrom has continued to hold a personal hatred for Barker ever since, eventually appearing as the featured interviewee for the 2026 E! series Dirty Rotten Scandals.

=== With other staff members ===
Two models from the Barker era who remained into the Carey transition also filed lawsuits. These suits alleged misconduct by executive producer Michael G. Richards and producer Adam Sandler (not the actor).

Brandi Sherwood sued after being terminated while on maternity leave and was awarded more than $8 million in damages in 2012.
