= Gameshow Marathon =

Gameshow Marathon can refer to:

- Gameshow Marathon (British game show), a UK television series
- Gameshow Marathon (American TV series), an adaptation of the UK version
