= Holly Hallstrom =

American former model (born 1952)

- Born: Holly Anne Hallstrom; August 24, 1952 (age 73); San Antonio, Texas, U.S.
- Occupations: Model; actress
- Years active: 1977–1996
- Known for: The Price Is Right
- Height: 5 ft 11 in (1.80 m)

Holly Anne Hallstrom (born August 24, 1952) is an American former model. She appeared on the daytime game show The Price Is Right from 1977 to 1995 as one of the "Barker's Beauties" models.

== The Price Is Right ==
On January 3, 1977, Hallstrom joined the cast of The Price Is Right as the third model after Anitra Ford left the program the previous fall. Hallstrom appeared, along with Janice Pennington and Dian Parkinson, as one of the principal models on all versions of the show from 1977 through the early 1990s.

Hallstrom briefly left the program in 1983 to pursue an acting career but rejoined the cast in 1984.

=== Departure and lawsuit ===
In October 1995, host Bob Barker dismissed Hallstrom from The Price Is Right, purportedly because she had gained 14 pounds (6.4 kg) because of a prescription medication that she was taking. Hallstrom later alleged that the real reason for her dismissal was her refusal to support Barker when model Dian Parkinson sued him for sexual harassment. Hallstrom claimed that Barker ordered her to appear on talk shows and solicit interviews to assert that Parkinson was lying, and that he pressured her to misrepresent her memory of certain events. Hallstrom, who did not wish to become involved in Barker's dispute with Parkinson or perjure herself, claimed that she refused and was dismissed from the show. In response to angry letters from The Price Is Right fans after Hallstrom's dismissal, Barker sued her for libel and slander (Barker v. Hallstrom), claiming that she was lying, but he dropped the suit 48 hours before the trial was to begin. The court declared Hallstrom the prevailing party and ordered Barker to pay Hallstrom's legal fees. Barker, in a 2002 interview with Larry King, stated that Hallstrom was fired in a business decision; by the time of Hallstrom's dismissal, the show had four permanent models, and with Mark Goodson dying in 1992, his son Jonathan Goodson was looking to make the series more profitable as they prepared to sell. In the same interview, Barker stated that if her weight had been the reason for her firing, "we would've fired her years ago." Hallstrom acknowledged that her weight had indeed likely played a role in her dismissal, as she had noticed that even before her firing, she had been directed to model prizes in ways that would not draw attention to her figure, such as standing behind large objects.

Hallstrom countersued Barker for age, weight, and medical discrimination, wrongful termination and malicious prosecution (Hallstrom v. Barker), and in October 2005, she received a multimillion-dollar settlement. The settlement amount could have been more, but early settlement agreements all contained a non-disclosure agreement that banned Hallstrom from saying anything disparaging about Barker to the media. However, Hallstrom refused to agree to the mutuality clause of the settlement agreement, thereby retaining the right to speak freely against Barker in the media. To retain her right to speak about the case, and to protect herself against what she called Barker's "shameful manipulation of the media," Hallstrom accepted a lesser financial amount but with a settlement that did not contain a hush clause. She has also started a foundation for people who have suffered wrongful or malicious workplace conditions and who do not have the resources to confront powerful individuals or companies.

Following their testimonies in Barker's lawsuit against Hallstrom, models Janice Pennington and Kathleen Bradley, production assistants Linda Riegert and Sherrill Paris and veteran director Paul Alter all departed The Price Is Right. Pennington, who had been with the show since its 1972 debut, and Bradley, who appeared on the show between 1990 and 2000, received out-of-court financial settlements. Although she has not spoken publicly about Barker or her departure from The Price Is Right since receiving her financial settlement, Bradley has referred to her termination as "abrupt" and "unexpected." Paris sued Barker for wrongful termination. Production assistant Sharon Friem, who had also been dismissed, sued Barker for wrongful termination, sexual harassment, and sex discrimination, claiming that she was the target of many inappropriate sexual remarks and gestures. Both women received financial settlements to drop their lawsuits. Alter briefly regained his position on the show in 2000 and remained with it until he retired. Pennington was largely positive about her experiences on the show and with Barker and spoke in glowing terms about their working relationship after his death; Barker, in 2002, also spoke positively of Pennington in his interview with King, particularly in contrast to his legal troubles with Parkinson and Hallstrom.

Hallstrom never married and has no children, which is why she believes that she was the one member of The Price Is Right who could fight what she called "miserable tyranny at the hands of a mad dictator" (referring to Barker). During the nearly ten years in which her lawsuit was in the courts, she spent all of her savings, sold her house, and lived from her car. In an interview, she said: "I refused to give up and let that evil old bastard win." She resides in one of several houses that she owns in the San Antonio vicinity. She has granted occasional interviews for shows such as The Today Show and The View. She appeared on the E! docuseries, "Dirty Rotten Scandals" in March 2026, chronicling The Price is Right's scandals during the 1990's and early 2000's, including her controversial departure in 1995; she noted that her hatred of Barker remained after his death, but that she was now no longer afraid of retribution and could express that hatred fully.

== Other game show appearances ==
Hallstrom also appeared several times as a guest panelist on Match Game. In the early 1990s, she made several appearances on Family Feud with her The Price Is Right co-stars, most of whom played against the cast of The Young and the Restless.

== Personal life ==
Holly had a relationship with John Darby who had a role in The Young and The Restless. The relationship lasted about two years from 1984 to 1986.
