= Destination (band) =

Disco studio group

Destination was a disco group from New York City whose song "Move On Up" / "Up Up Up" / "Destination's Theme," spent in 1979 four weeks at number one on the Hot Dance Music/Club Play chart, and reached #68 on the Hot Soul Singles chart. A trio, Destination consisted of Danny Lugo, Kathleen Bradley (who would later become one of "Barker's Beauties" on The Price Is Right) and Love Chyle Theus.

== See also ==
- List of number-one dance hits (United States)
- List of artists who reached number one on the US Dance chart
