= Kathleen Bradley =

American model, actress, singer

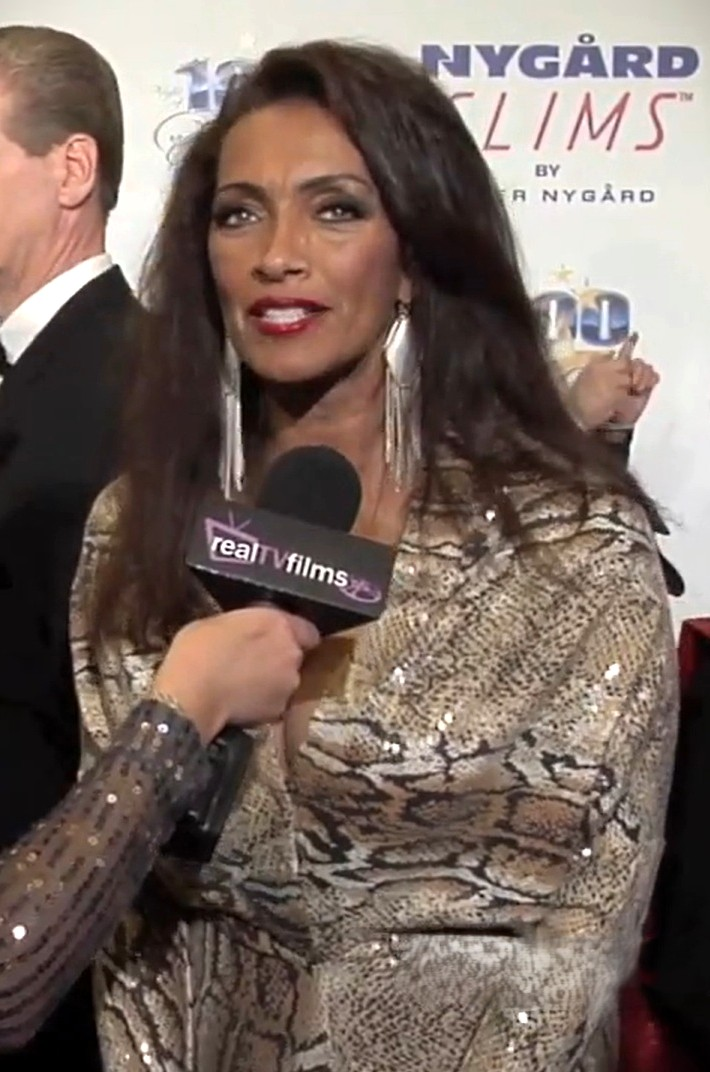
- Bradley in 2014
- Born: 1950 or 1951 (age 74–75); Girard, Ohio, U.S.
- Other name: Kathleen Bradley–Overton
- Occupations: Model; singer; actress; host; memoirist
- Known for: The Price Is Right
- Spouses: Bill Overton (m. 1980; div. 1984) Terrence Redd (m. 1988)
- Children: 2
- Modeling information
- Height: 5'9 (175 cm)
- Hair color: Dark Brown
- Eye color: Light Brown

Kathleen Bradley is an American former model, former singer, actress and host. She is primarily known as a "Barker's Beauty" on the CBS daytime game show The Price Is Right from 1990 until 2000. She is noted as the first permanent African American model on the show.

== Career ==
Born to Albert and Winifred Bradley in Girard, Ohio, Bradley was the only girl of four children. She won the "Miss Black California" award in 1971. In the 1970s, she was part of two short-lived disco groups, The Love Machine and Destination. She played the role of Mrs. Parker in the 1995 movie Friday. Twenty-nine years later, both Cube and Bradley appeared together again in his music video "It's My Ego", where she appears as a churchgoer in a matching blue dress and wide-brimmed hat in 2024.

=== Departure from The Price Is Right ===
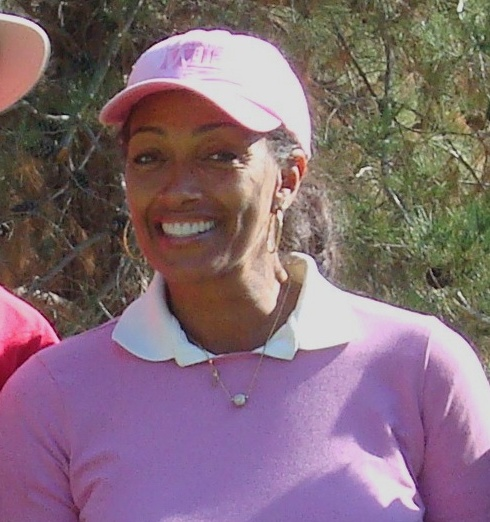
Bradley in 2007

Bradley, along with longtime model Janice Pennington, was released from her modeling duties on The Price Is Right on October 19, 2000, shortly after having testified during the lawsuit for slander and defamation of character host and executive producer Bob Barker filed against model Holly Hallstrom. Bradley's final episode aired on December 13, 2000. Barker lost his suit against Hallstrom. Bradley alleged that she and Pennington were fired for their testimonies in that lawsuit and negotiated a financial settlement in lieu of a lawsuit. Barker insisted that Bradley's accusation was untrue and that the dismissal stemmed from a change in ownership, and also stated that he appreciated Pennington's testimony.

In June 2014, Bradley released her memoirs, Backstage at The Price Is Right: Memoirs of a Barker Beauty.

== Personal ==
Bradley has been married twice. Her first marriage was to actor Bill Overton from 1980 to 1984. She has been married to mechanical engineer Terrence Redd since 1988. She has two children; a daughter, Cheyenne Overton, from her marriage with Overton; and their son Terrence Redd II. Her stepdaughter Dior is from Redd's marriage to actress Bern Nadette Stanis.

== Filmography ==
=== Film ===
| Year | Title | Role | Notes |
|---|---|---|---|
| 1989 | Troop Beverly Hills | Mrs. Shakar | |
| 1989 | Harlem Nights | Lady | |
| 1987 | Perfume | Vashtii | |
| 1995 | Friday | Mrs. Parker | |
| 2000 | An Everlasting Piece | Bronagh's Cousin | |
| 2007 | The Stolen Moments of September | Mohogany | |
| 2014 | Bitter Inheritance | Mrs. Morgan | Short |
| 2016 | All-Star Party for Kathleen Bradley | Guest of Honor | TV Movie |
| 2018 | Men-O-Pause- Ages of the Colors of Love Stageplay | Brown | Video |
| 2020 | She's the One | Judge Jenny | |
| 2021 | Dice Game Pt. 2 | Mrs. Parker | Video short |
| 2021 | A Day of Trouble | Yvonne | |

=== Television ===
| Year | Title | Role | Notes |
|---|---|---|---|
| 1978 | Good Times | The Nurse | Episode: "Blood Will Tell" |
| 1988 | Amen | Bailiff | Episode: "Deacon Dearest" |
| 1990-2000 | The Price Is Right | Herself/model | Main Cast: Season 19-29 |
| 1993 | Family Feud | Herself | Episode: "The Price Is Right vs. the Young and the Restless" |
| 1994 | The Suzanne Somers Show | Herself | Episode: "Episode #1.47" |
| 1997 | Access Hollywood | Herself | Episode: "Daytime Television" |
| 1998 | Martial Law | The Price Is Right Hostess | Episode: "Shanghai Express" |
| 2002 | E! True Hollywood Story | Herself | Episode: "The Price Is Right" |
| 2005 | Negermagasinet | Herself | Episode: "Bubba Smith" |
| 2016-18 | Grey's Anatomy | O.R. Nurse | 2 Episodes |
| 2019 | A House Divided | Pamela | 2 Episodes |
