= Manuela Arbeláez =

Colombian model (born 1988)

- Born: Manuela Arbeláez Correa; September 9, 1988 (age 38); Medellín, Antioquia, Colombia
- Occupations: Actress, Model
- Years active: 2006–present
- Known for: The Price Is Right
- Spouse: Matthew Doherty (2018–present)
- Children: 2
- Modeling information
- Height: 5 ft 7 in (1.70 m)
- Hair color: Black
- Eye color: Brown
- Agency: CESD

Manuela Arbeláez Correa (born September 9, 1988) is a Colombian-American model and actress, perhaps best known for her work on the television game show The Price Is Right.

== Life and career ==
Arbeláez was born in Medellín, Colombia to Luis Carlos Arbeláez and Gloria Correa, but moved to the United States in 2006 and relocated to West New York, New Jersey. Shortly after moving to the United States, Arbeláez became one of the finalists during the 2008 season of Nuestra Belleza Latina, a beauty contest/reality show hybrid airing on the American Spanish-language television channel Univision placing 6th place in the competition.

Later that year, Arbeláez was one of the five finalists in The Price Is Right Model Search contest. Each of the finalists appeared as a model on an episode of the game show in October 2008. The winner was chosen by an internet fan vote and won the opportunity to tape five additional episodes.

Although Arbeláez did not win the contest, she impressed the producers of The Price Is Right and was hired as a model for the show in 2009. She continued as a regular model the following season. In 2012, Complex magazine selected Arbeláez as number one on its list of The 25 Hottest Game Show Eye Candy.

In 2010, Arbeláez appeared in the music video for Robin Thicke's song "It's in the Mornin". She was cast for a two episode guest appearance on soap opera The Bold and the Beautiful in June 2010. In October 2010, Arbeláez was the lead girl in the music video "Loving You No More" by Diddy - Dirty Money featuring Drake. She was one of the trophy models at the 54th Grammy Awards on February 12, 2012.

On April 2, 2015, Arbeláez accidentally revealed the winning choice during the "Five Price Tags" game, securing a $21,960 car for the contestant. The resulting video on YouTube posted by the show went viral online, amassing over 15 million views.

== Personal life ==
Arbeláez married to Matthew Doherty on February 17, 2018. On February 17, 2019, their first wedding anniversary, the couple announced on Instagram that they were expecting their first child, a daughter, in August 2019. Matilda "Tilly" was born on August 19. On April 17, 2022, Arbeláez and Doherty announced that they were expecting a second child in October. Their second daughter, Madeline Mercedes Doherty, was born on October 18, 2022.
