= Devin Goda =

American model and football player

Profile
- Position: Wide receiver

Personal information
- Born: May 5, 1989 (age 37); Monongahela, Pennsylvania
- Listed height: 6 ft 2 in (1.88 m)
- Listed weight: 218 lb (99 kg)

Career information
- College: Slippery Rock
- NFL draft: 2012: undrafted

Career history
- Baltimore Ravens (2012)*
- * Offseason or practice squad member only

Devin Goda (born May 5, 1989) is an American model and former professional American football player.

== Biography ==
Goda was born on May 5, 1989, in Monongahela, Pennsylvania. His childhood was spent on his grandparents' farm.

Goda attended Slippery Rock University of Pennsylvania, where he played college football as a wide receiver. He was the second-leading receiver in the school's history, finishing his career with 173 receptions and 2,259 receiving yards. He signed with the Baltimore Ravens of the National Football League (NFL) as an undrafted free agent on May 11, 2012. He suffered a hamstring injury during training camp and was waived before the start of the regular season on August 26, 2012.

Goda subsequently decided to pursue a modeling career. He appeared in national campaigns for Macy's, Under Armour, and Calvin Klein. In 2018, Goda joined The Price Is Right, serving as the third permanent male model on the American version of the show. He splits his time between New York and Los Angeles.

== See also ==
- The Price Is Right models
- Wilhelmina Models
