= Gwendolyn Osborne =

British model and actress

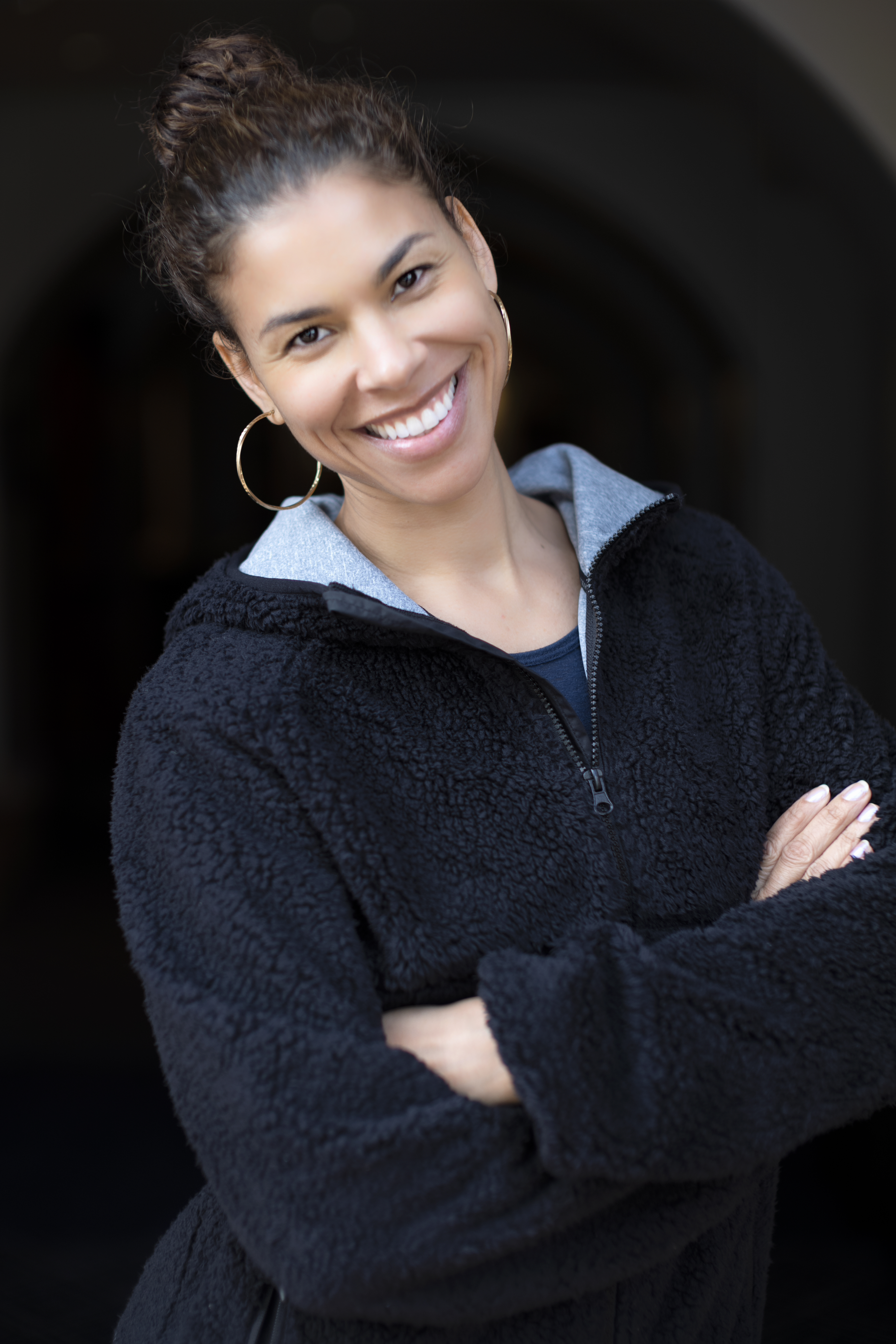
- Gwendolyn Osborne in 2020.
- Born: 7 August 1978 (age 47); Bath, Somerset, England
- Other name: Gwendolyn Osborne-Smith
- Occupations: actress model public speaker
- Years active: 2002-present
- Known for: The Price Is Right
- Spouse: Kenny Smith (2006–2018)
- Children: 3
- Website: gwendolynosborne.com

Gwendolyn Osborne (born 7 August 1978) is a British actress and former model who spent 12 years on The Price Is Right as a model from 2005 to 2017. Osborne was recognized as one of the "longest-running women of color on a daytime game show.” On 17 October 2017, it was announced that she would be leaving the show to pursue other interests.

== Acting/Producing ==
Osborne had a role as an Elite Amazonian in the film Wonder Woman 1984, directed by Patty Jenkins. Other movie and films include, Jack and Jill with Adam Sandler, and Any Given Sunday. Osborne had roles on several daytime soap operas which include, General Hospital, The Bold And The Beautiful, and The Young And The Restless. She has played Misandra on the Bouncetv series In the Cut. She also played Jade Dominquez for two seasons of Ocean Ave. In 2023, Osborne had a role in Grown-ish and played Juliette. Osborne starred and produced a reality series based on her life, Meet the Smiths, on TBS. Working with the Global production group ITV America as a producer, Osborne was nominated for the segment "Foulshots by Kenny Smith" on TRUTV in the Cynopsis Short Form Video Festival.

== Podcast ==
In 2021, Osborne started her podcast Tea with Gwen interviewing women from diverse backgrounds on career, health, and wellness.

== Music ==
As a singer-songwriter, Osborne released her single "Give My Love" in 2021.

== Personal life ==
Born to a Jamaican mother and British father, Osborne married retired NBA player and TNT basketball analyst Kenny Smith on 2 September 2006. They have two children together and Smith is stepfather to Osborne's daughter from a previous relationship. Osborne filed for divorce from Smith in 2018.
