= Gameshow Marathon (American game show) =

- Also known as: Game$how Marathon
- Directed by: R. Brian DiPirro
- Presented by: Ricki Lake
- Starring: Lance Bass; Paige Davis; Tim Meadows; Kathy Najimy; Leslie Nielsen; Brande Roderick; Panelists: Adam Carolla; Adrianne Curry; George Foreman; Kathy Griffin; Bruce Vilanch; Betty White
- Narrated by: Rich Fields
- Theme music composer: Russ Landau
- Country of origin: United States
- No. of seasons: 1
- No. of episodes: 7

Production
- Executive producers: Cecile Frot-Coutez; Stuart Krasnow; Paul Jackson
- Producers: Sean Kelly; Ricki Lake; Kathy Sutula; Joel Zimmer
- Production locations: CBS Television City; Hollywood, California
- Editors: Carl Cramer; Gary Win. Jerls; William Lorton; Ryan Reilly
- Running time: approx. 40–44 minutes
- Production companies: FremantleMedia North America; Granada America

Original release
- Network: CBS
- Release: May 31 – June 29, 2006

Gameshow Marathon (stylized as Game$how Marathon) is an American television program which aired on CBS from May 31 to June 29, 2006. It is based on the United Kingdom series Ant & Dec's Gameshow Marathon which aired on ITV in 2005. It also aired in Canada on CTV.

The show features contestants competing in some of television's most historically popular game shows, in a single-elimination format until an ultimate winner is found. Both the British and American versions featured celebrity contestants.

The American version was produced by FremantleMedia North America and Granada America and was hosted by Ricki Lake and announced by Rich Fields, who also served as the announcer of The Price Is Right. In the United States, the series only aired for a single season, while in the United Kingdom, a second season aired in 2007, this time entitled Vernon Kay's Gameshow Marathon and hosted by Vernon Kay. This program was recorded at Stage 46, CBS Television City in Los Angeles, CA, USA.

== Premise ==
The seven-part game show tournament featured celebrity contestants Lance Bass, Paige Davis, Tim Meadows, Kathy Najimy, Leslie Nielsen, and Brande Roderick. The six played The Price Is Right, Let's Make a Deal (the only show which had not previously aired on CBS at that time), Beat the Clock, Press Your Luck, Card Sharks, Match Game, and Family Feud to progress in the tournament. The series used replicas of each show's original set, or in the case of The Price Is Right, actual props from the series currently airing. Each installment began with a narration of the format of the particular show featured on that episode coupled with montages of clips from each program's history. The Press Your Luck episode was dedicated in memory to its host Peter Tomarken, who died in a plane crash shortly before Gameshow Marathon premiered.

== Tournament format ==
The format of each individual show was largely unchanged. All six celebrity contestants participated in the first game, The Price Is Right. The Showcase winner from this episode claimed the first of four seats in "Finalists' Row". The remaining contestants after each game was played then participated in the next game (five for Let's Make a Deal, four for Beat the Clock, three for Press Your Luck) to win one of the remaining seats. After the fourth game, the remaining two contestants were eliminated.

The four contestants in "Finalists' Row" were then paired in a competition to play the fifth and sixth games (Card Sharks and Match Game). The winners of those two games then proceeded to the "championship game", Family Feud.

For the finals, each celebrity assembled a five-person team of family and friends to play Family Feud, with the charity of the winning "family" receiving $100,000.

Brande Roderick was the showcase winner on the episode featuring The Price Is Right. Lance Bass became the next semifinalist from Let's Make a Deal, and Paige Davis won the Beat the Clock installment. Kathy Najimy won the last semifinal slot on Press Your Luck, and Tim Meadows and Leslie Nielsen were eliminated at the end of that episode. Roderick defeated Davis in Card Sharks, and Najimy defeated Bass in Match Game. Najimy and her family then beat Roderick and her family on Family Feud to capture the top prize.

The Match Game installment also featured Adam Carolla, Adrianne Curry, George Foreman, Kathy Griffin, Bruce Vilanch, and Betty White (in her traditional seat) as the panel. The six also appeared as audience members during the Price is Right episode (but did not play).

The "Barker's Beauties" from The Price Is Right also played a role in some of the installments. Gilbert Gottfried appeared on the Let's Make a Deal episode in a Zonk and in the Big Deal prize.

=== Rule changes ===
For The Price Is Right, the top prize for Plinko was $100,000 and featured the same layout as seen in prime time episodes with a $20,000 slot in the center. Three games were played on the episode, and the two highest-scoring contestants in the Showcase Showdown advanced to the Showcase. The winning showcase (and any prizes won by that celebrity previously) went to a viewer watching at home.

Let's Make a Deal was played exactly as it was during the Monty Hall era in which the celebrities and some actual audience members taking part in the deals and they were wearing costumes, and it ended with the Big Deal, worth over $87,000. The celebrity who won the most advanced to Finalists' Row and their prizes were awarded to a home viewer.

Beat the Clock was played in a tournament format. Two of the celebrities played a stunt as a team with a time limit of 60 seconds. The other two celebrities played the same stunt, trying to beat the first team's time. The two celebrities on the winning team then faced off in another stunt. The winner of the second stunt played one final stunt alone and if it was completed successfully within the 60 second time limit, a home viewer wins a car in addition to the other prizes earned by the winning celebrity.

The game board for Press Your Luck had top amounts of $3,000, $4,000 and $5,000 + One Spin in round one, and those values doubled in round two. The winning celebrity's cash and prizes went to a home viewer.

Contestants playing Card Sharks received $1,000 for winning round one and $2,000 for round two. Instead of using the tiebreaker round featured on the NBC and CBS/1986 syndicated versions, a complete round with five cards and four questions was played as round three for $3,000. The contestant who won the most money won the game. The Money Cards offered a top prize of $144,000. $1,000 was given at the start of that round, and another $1,000 was given on the second level. Minimum bets were $50 on each card until the Big Bet, where a bet equal to at least half the current score must be wagered. Like the 1986 version of the show, the contestant could change one card per line by choosing one of three spare cards, doubles resulted in pushes. Like the 1986 version of the show, a car game was added, however, it did not resemble either version used during that period. In this car game, the contestant had to correctly determine whether the number of cheerleaders that answered "yes" to a question was higher or lower than five, and a card taken from the blue deck was used for the actual answer.

In Match Game, two contestants each tried to match the celebrities as on the original series. The winner after Round 3 moved on to the Super Match for a chance to win up to $50,000 for a home viewer. Two audience matches were played with $500, $250, and $100 as the possible payouts, and the contestant had a chance to multiply the total won from the audience matches by 50 by matching one celebrity in the Head-to-Head match.

The finale featured Family Feud, with teams competing to score 300 points first. The points doubled in round four and tripled in round five and beyond. In Fast Money, the first contestant had 20 seconds to answer the questions and the other received 25 seconds. A home viewer won $50,000 if the two contestants in Fast Money were able to reach or exceed 200 points.

The home viewer contest allowed viewers to win the cash and prizes won by the celebrity. It consisted of the showing of a classic clip pertaining to that day's show, with a corresponding question that had three multiple choice answers. A winner was selected from those entries that had the correct answer, and the prizes were delivered to the winner in a special segment during the next day's episode hosted by Todd Newton (who was famous for hosting Whammy! The All-New Press Your Luck and Family Game Night).
