= Amber Lancaster =

American actress and model

- Born: September 19, 1980 (age 46); Tacoma, Washington, U.S.
- Occupations: Actress; model; interior designer
- Years active: 1998–present
- Known for: The Price Is Right
- Spouse: A.J. Allodi (m. 2017; div. 2020)
- Children: 1

Amber Lancaster (born September 19, 1980) is an American model, actress and interior designer. She is best known for playing Jenny Swanson on MTVs The Hard Times of RJ Berger, as well as being a model on The Price Is Right.

== Early life ==
Lancaster was born in Tacoma, Washington. She attended Franklin Pierce High School in Tacoma. In 1998, she won the title of Miss Washington Teen USA. Lancaster went on to join the Sea Gals, the cheerleading squad of the Seattle Seahawks football team. She was a member of the Sea Gals for five seasons before moving to Los Angeles to pursue her dancing and modeling career.

== Career ==
In 2003, Lancaster was a regular dancer on the syndicated dance show Soul Train, where she enjoyed a three-year stint until leaving in 2006. Lancaster appeared in the music video for Bo Bice's song "The Real Thing".

In 2007, Lancaster made an appearance at the 2007 Scream Awards. The following year, she joined the cast of The Price Is Right as one of the show's models. In 2009, Lancaster was a trophy holder at the 61st Primetime Emmy Awards. She also appeared in the MTV comedy series The Hard Times of RJ Berger as Jenny Swanson.

Lancaster owns her own interior design business, Lancaster Interiors. In November 2021, Lancaster launched a clothing line with VICI Collection.

== Personal life ==
On October 7, 2017, Lancaster married businessman A.J. Allodi in Palm Springs, California.

In April 2019, Lancaster announced that the couple were expecting their first child in October 2019. However, Lancaster developed pre-eclampsia during her pregnancy, which resulted in their son, Russ, being born two months early on August 3, 2019. In late-August, Lancaster revealed she underwent a partial hysterectomy, the removal of her uterus, due to complications during the birth. Subsequently, in September 2020, Lancaster announced her separation from Allodi and have since divorced..

== Filmography ==
Television performances
Year	Title	Role	Notes
2003–2006	Soul Train	Dancer	Main Dancer (68 episodes)
2007	Redline	Hot Girl	
2007	Days of Our Lives	Mia	Episode: "#10663"
2008	My Own Worst Enemy	Spy Girl	Episode: "Breakdown"
2008–present	The Price Is Right	Herself/model	
2009	Entourage	Tara	Episode: "Scared Straight"
2010	Community	Christine	Episode: "The Psychology of Letting Go"
2010–11	The Hard Times of RJ Berger	Jenny Swanson	Main cast, 24 episodes
2011	The Bold and the Beautiful	Ashleigh	Episodes: "#6142" and "#6143"
2011	CSI: Miami	Jamie Mitchell	Episode: "Killer Regrets"
2012	Just My Luck	Brittany	Short
2014	Leading L.A.	Sarah	Video
