= Rich Fields =

American broadcaster, meteorologist, spokesman and show announcer

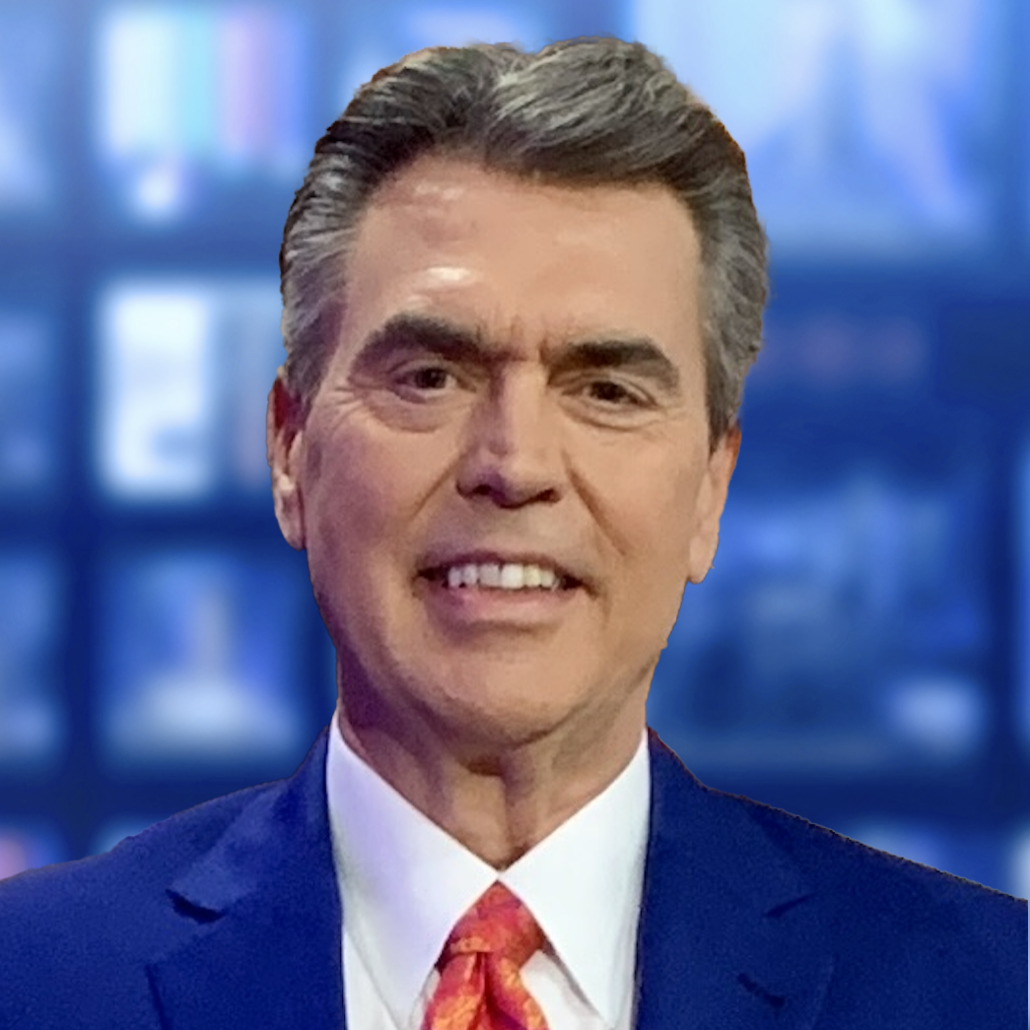
- Fields in 2021
- Born: Richard Wayne Fields; November 30, 1960 (age 65); Bay Village, Ohio, U.S.
- Occupations: Media personality; game show announcer; author; meteorologist; voice over artist; radio personality
- Years active: 1979–present
- Spouse: Christine Davidson (m. 2004)
- Website: www.richfields.tv

Richard Wayne Fields (born November 30, 1960) is an American media personality. He is prolific game show announcer (9 shows in his lifetime) and a veteran voice-over artist whose voice has been featured on national television shows. Fields is also a published author, an award winning show announcer, meteorologist and veteran radio personality (having worked at some 16 different outlets across the country). Fields is probably best known however, as the on-camera announcer for the American version of The Price Is Right with both Bob Barker and Drew Carey from 2004 to 2010.

== Early life and education ==
Fields was born on November 30, 1960, in Bay Village, Ohio, and raised in Avon, Ohio, before moving to Clearwater, Florida, in 1976. He graduated from the University of Florida Gainesville seven years later with a Bachelor's degree in broadcasting. While attending UF, Fields was diagnosed with both testicular cancer and lymphoma, both of which he survived.

In early 2000, Fields returned to college at Mississippi State University to study meteorology and later became a successful Los Angeles television weatherman. Rich completed his MSU Meteorology internship at WFLA-TV in Tampa, Florida.

== Career ==
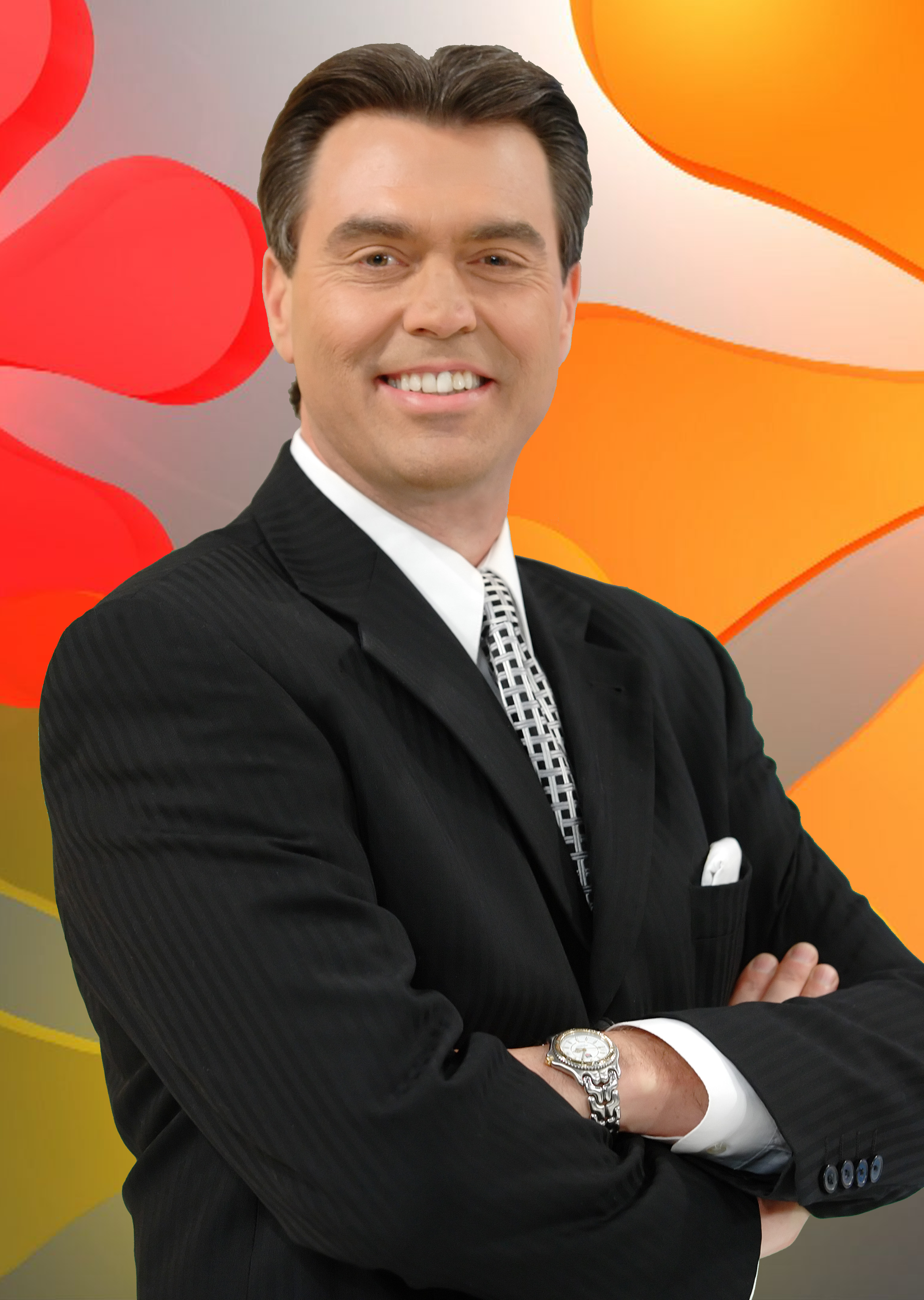
Fields during his tenure with The Price Is Right, c. 2007

In 1979, during a question-and-answer segment with (then) announcer Johnny Olson at a taping of The Price Is Right, Fields asked how he could get Olson's job. Olson brought Fields onstage and asked him to give an example of how he would call a contestant to "Come on down!" Twenty-five years later, Fields would be the long-running voice of a new generation of Price Is Right fans.

Fields worked as a radio personality starting in 1979, serving some 16 different radio stations across the country, including markets like Los Angeles, California, Denver, Colorado and Tampa, Florida. He DJ’d music radio shows for over a decade on CBS' 93.1 FM frequency in Los Angeles during the 1980s and 1990s.

In 1995 Fields was hired by Mark Goodson Productions as the announcer of the Florida Lottery TV game show Flamingo Fortune.

Fields studied meteorology at Mississippi State University and in 2002, was offered the morning weather position at KPSP-LP in Palm Springs, California. Fields was later promoted to Chief Meteorologist for KPSP and was charged with presenting the nightly newscasts for the station until May 2004.

On March 30, 2004, producer Roger Dobkowitz notified Fields that legendary show-host Bob Barker, had personally chosen Rich as the next announcer for The Price Is Right, a decision following the death of longtime announcer Rod Roddy. The announcement of Fields' hiring was announced by Bob Barker at the April 6, 2004, taping of the show, which aired on April 23. Fields signed a contract to be the series' announcer through 2010.

Fields also served as the announcer of the All-Star summer tournament series Gameshow Marathon from May 31 until June 29, 2006, on CBS. It was during this seven-show series that Fields set a record for announcing the most televised game show titles in a single season. This American version was hosted by actress and talk show host Ricki Lake.

In 2007, Fields appeared with Bob Barker on a fictional episode of The Price Is Right in an episode of How I Met Your Mother.

In 2009, Fields had his own comedy web series on YouTube called Rich Fields Gone Wild where he discusses situations in his daily life with Lou Ferrigno (The Incredible Hulk) and Adam West (Batman) as guest stars in those particular episodes.

On July 16, 2010, Fields confirmed that he would not be returning to The Price Is Right for its 39th season and was immediately picked up by CBS News in Los Angeles. From 2010 to 2016, Fields was a staff meteorologist for CBS-LA, delivering forecasts on its properties KCBS-TV, KCAL-TV, KNX, KFWB, and KRTH.

Fields served as the announcer on 55 episodes of Wheel of Fortune in 2010 following the death of Charlie O'Donnell, and provided post-production voice-over work for over 11 weeks of episodes, plus specials.

From 2017 until 2020, Fields held down the Afternoon Drive position on Q105 (WRBQ-FM). After nearly three years on the air at Q105, Fields and nearly the entire air-staff were let go during staffing cutbacks due to the COVID-19 pandemic.

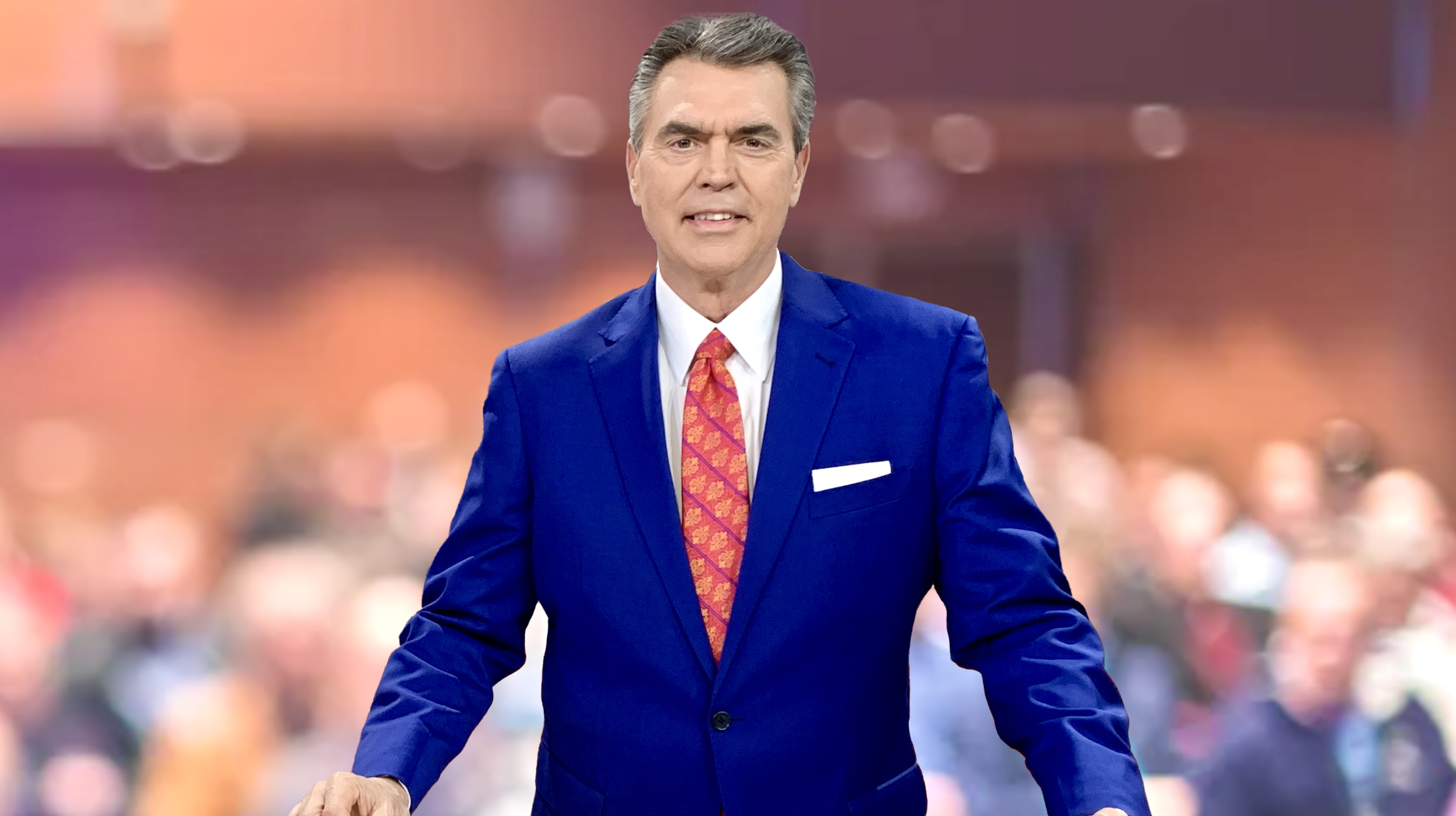

In November 2021, Rich Fields was hired as a staff meteorologist at WTSP (10 Tampa Bay), the CBS affiliate in Tampa, Florida, where he stayed until 2023.

Rich Fields is considered a proficient game show announcer, having voiced 9 different show titles in his lifetime. He operates a VO studio in Clearwater Beach, Florida and continues to supply voice-over for commercial and corporate clients world-wide.
