= James O'Halloran (actor) =

Australian model and actor

- Born: James William O'Halloran; 20 October 1984 (age 42)
- Occupations: Model; actor
- Years active: 2008-present
- Known for: The Price Is Right
- Spouse: Jaimee Gooley (m. 2016)

James William O'Halloran (born 20 October 1984) is an Australian model and actor best known as the second male model on the U.S. TV show The Price Is Right. He was born in Melbourne, Australia. James currently resides in Los Angeles.

In 2014, he moved to the U.S. and participated in a nationwide casting titled The Price is Right Male Model Search, which he won. He became the second male model (following Robert Scott Wilson) on The Price Is Right, beating fellow finalists Jay Byars and Jonathan Morgan.

James worked for three years as an industrial designer while taking nighttime acting classes. He eventually quit his job to become a model.
