= Dian Parkinson =

American model

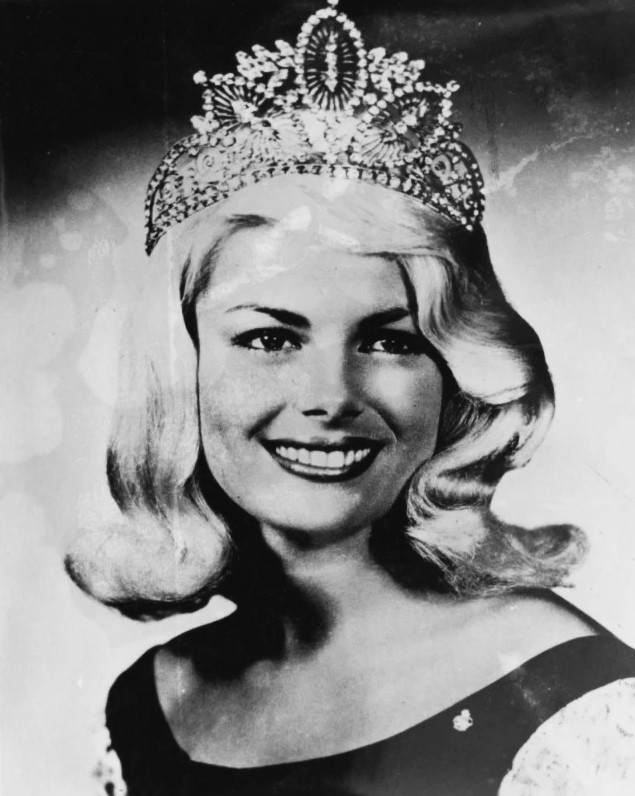
- Parkinson in 1965
- Born: Diana Lynn Batts; November 30, 1944 (age 81); Jacksonville, North Carolina, U.S.
- Occupations: Model, actress, beauty pageant
- Known for: The Price Is Right

Dian Parkinson (born Diana Lynn Batts; November 30, 1944) is an American former actress, model and beauty pageant titleholder. She represented the United States at Miss World 1965 in London, where she was placed as 1st runner-up. From 1975 to 1993, Parkinson worked as a model on The Price Is Right.

== Career history ==
In 1965, while living in Falls Church, Virginia, Parkinson won the Miss District of Columbia USA title and competed as Diana Batts in the Miss USA 1965 pageant, where she placed fourth runner-up. Parkinson won the 1965 Miss USA World contest. She went on to represent the United States in the international Miss World 1965 contest, and was first runner-up to Lesley Langley of the United Kingdom.

Parkinson travelled during 1965 with the Bob Hope USO Show, including performances in Vietnam during late December 1965, and also served as Queen of the 1965 Bob Hope Desert Classic golf tournament.

In 1975, Parkinson was a guest star on The Mary Tyler Moore Show ("Ted's Moment of Glory").

In 1978, Parkinson appeared in the pilot of the TV series Vega$.

=== The Price Is Right ===
From 1975 to 1993, Parkinson was a model on the US television game show The Price Is Right. During her time on the program she became involved in a sexual relationship with the recently widowed host of the program, Bob Barker.

Parkinson left the show in 1993, supposedly to "pursue other interests", as Barker announced during her final taping, which aired on June 18, 1993.

In 1994, Parkinson filed a lawsuit in Los Angeles Superior Court (case no. BC106366) against Barker for sexual harassment. The suit was withdrawn in April 1995, with Parkinson claiming it was too costly and had taken a toll on her health.

=== Playboy ===
Parkinson was the cover girl of Playboy in December 1991 at the age of 47 and again in May 1993. In 1993, Parkinson was featured exclusively in a Playboy "Newsstand Edition" photo magazine entitled Playboy Presents Dian Parkinson. Also in 1993, the video Playboy Celebrity Centrefold: Dian Parkinson was released.

=== EZ Krunch ===
In 1993, Parkinson was the official spokesperson for the home exercise equipment machine EZ Krunch.

=== Space Ghost: Coast to Coast ===
In 1994, Parkinson appeared as a guest on the animated talk show Space Ghost: Coast to Coast ("Punch").

== Personal life ==
Parkinson was married to E. Duke Vincent from 1977 to 1982.

From 2015 to 2019, Parkinson owned a residence in Westlake Village, California. Her whereabouts since selling that residence are unknown, and an attempt to reach Parkinson in 2026 was unsuccessful.

Preceded by Bobbie Johnson	Miss District of Columbia USA; 1965	Succeeded by Sue Counts
