= The Price Is Right =

American television game show

- Also known as: The New Price Is Right (1972–73)
- Genre: Game show
- Created by: Bob Stewart; Mark Goodson; Bill Todman
- Developed by: Fremantle
- Directed by: Marc Breslow; Paul Alter; Bart Eskander; Rich DiPirro; Michael Dimich; Ryan Polito; Adam Sandler
- Presented by: Bob Barker; Drew Carey; Nighttime: Dennis James; Bob Barker; Tom Kennedy; Drew Carey
- Starring: Rachel Reynolds; Amber Lancaster; Manuela Arbeláez; James O'Halloran; Devin Goda; Alexis Gaube
- Announcer: Johnny Olson; Rod Roddy; Rich Fields; George Gray
- Composer: Edd Kalehoff
- Country of origin: United States
- Original language: English
- No. of seasons: 54
- No. of episodes: 10,071 (CBS); Nighttime (1972–80): 300 (1 unaired); Nighttime (1985–86): 170

Production
- Executive producers: Frank Wayne (1972–1988); Bob Barker (1988–2007); Syd Vinnedge (2007–2009); Mike Richards (2009–2019); Jennifer Mullin (2013–2018); Evelyn Warfel (2019–2025); John Quinn (2025–present)
- Producers: Jay Wolpert (1972–1978); Barbara Hunter (1978–1984); Phil Wayne Rossi (1978–2004); Roger Dobkowitz (1984–2008); Kathy Greco (2008–2011); Adam Sandler (2009–2019); Ronilyn Reilly (2021–2022); Whitney Kieser (2022–2023); Kimberly Lowry (2023–2024); Lauren Chamberlin (2025–present); Devin Schefferine (2025–present); Matthew Timmons (2026–present)
- Production locations: The Bob Barker Studio, Studio 33, Television City, Los Angeles, California (1972–2023); Haven Studios, Los Angeles, California (2023–present)
- Running time: 38–48 minutes; (1975–present); 22–26 minutes; (1972–75; 1972–80 Nighttime; 1985–86 Nighttime)
- Production companies: Mark Goodson-Bill Todman; Productions (1972–84); Price Productions; (1972–80 Nighttime; 1985–86 Nighttime; 1972–94); Mark Goodson Productions; (1984–2007); All American Television; (1996–98); Pearson Television; (1998–2002); Fremantle (2002–present) (Note: Known from 2002 to 2018 as FremantleMedia North America); in association with CBS The Price Is Right Productions, Inc. (February 19, 2003–present)

Original release
- Network: CBS
- Release: September 4, 1972 – present
- Network: Syndication (Both editions)
- Release: September 11, 1972 – September 13, 1980
- Network: Syndication
- Release: September 9, 1985 – May 30, 1986
- Network: Syndication (The New Price Is Right)
- Release: September 12, 1994 – January 27, 1995
- Network: CBS (The Price Is Right at Night)
- Release: May 17, 2002 – present

Related
- The New Price Is Right (1994–95); The Price Is Right (1956–65)

The Price Is Right is an American television game show. A 1972 revival by Mark Goodson and Bill Todman of their 1956–1965 show of the same name, the new version adds many distinctive gameplay elements. Contestants compete in a variety of games to determine the prices of products or prizes which they may win. These contestants are selected from the studio audience and are called onstage to compete by the announcer using the show's catchphrase of "come on down!"

The program premiered September 4, 1972, on CBS. Bob Barker was the series's longest-running host from its debut until his retirement in June 2007, when Drew Carey took over. Johnny Olson was the show's original announcer, holding this role until just before his death in 1985. He was replaced by Rod Roddy, who remained with the show until just before his own death in late 2003. Rich Fields took over as announcer in 2004 and was replaced with George Gray in 2011. The show has featured numerous models as prize presenters, most notably Anitra Ford, Janice Pennington, Dian Parkinson, Holly Hallstrom, and Kathleen Bradley.

The Price Is Right has aired over 10,000 episodes since its debut. It is the longest-running game show in the United States and is one of the longest-running network series in United States television history. The 53rd season premiered on September 23, 2024, with both a daytime and primetime episode, and its 10,000th episode aired on February 26, 2025.

On March 2, 2022, it was announced that The Price Is Right would be inducted into the NAB Broadcasting Hall of Fame. Host Drew Carey and executive producer Evelyn Warfel accepted the award at The Achievement in Broadcasting Awards on the NAB Show main stage in Las Vegas on April 24, 2022.

Beginning with season 54, which premiered in September 2025, The Price Is Right became the longest running game show in the world, surpassing the Chilean variety show Sábado Gigante, which aired 53 seasons from 1962 until 2015. Season 55 premiered on September 21, 2026, marking the 20th season with Carey as host.

== Gameplay ==
The gameplay of the show consists of four distinct competition elements, in which preliminary contestants (nine in most episodes) are eventually narrowed to two finalists who compete in the game's final element, the "Showcases". All elements of the show are based around identifying the prices of products.

=== One Bid ===
At the start of the show, four contestants are called from the audience by the announcer to take a spot in the front row behind bidding lecterns. This area is known as "Contestants' Row" or "Bidders' Row". After calling each selected contestant's name, the announcer shouts "Come on down!", the show's catch phrase.

The four contestants in Contestants' Row compete in a bidding round, sometimes referred to as "One Bid", to determine which contestant will play the next pricing game. A prize is shown and each contestant gives a single bid for the item in whole dollars, as the price is rounded to the nearest dollar. In the first One Bid game of each episode, bidding begins with the contestant on the viewer's left (usually, the first contestant who came down to the Contestant's Row) and proceeds right. A contestant may not duplicate another's bid. The contestant whose bid is closest to the actual retail price of the prize without going over wins that prize, and gets to play the subsequent pricing game. If all four contestants' bids are higher than the actual retail price, all bids are erased, and the contestants are instructed to bid a second time without exceeding the lowest bid of the previous round. Bidding the exact price awards a $500 cash bonus.

After each of the first five pricing games, another contestant is called to "come on down" to fill the spot of the contestant who played the previous pricing game. Subsequent One Bid rounds begin with the newest contestant and wrap around. Contestants who fail to win a One Bid round and do not make it onstage to play a pricing game receive consolation prizes, often sponsored by companies revealed by the announcer near the end of the show.

A 1996 study from Stanford University analyzed the bidding behavior of contestants, noting that they rarely attempted to optimize their bidding strategies but that accuracy tended to improve the longer they stayed in Contestants' Row. A 2019 study from Harvard University noted that the accuracy of the average bid fell substantially over the course of the show's run, from 8% lower than the actual retail price at the series start in 1972 to over 20% by 2010, before stabilizing throughout the 2010s. The study concluded that accuracy correlated with inflation and hypothesized that periods of high inflation make people more attentive to prices, while also surmising that increasing e-commerce has made people less attentive to prices overall.

=== Pricing games ===
The winner of the One Bid joins the host onstage for the opportunity to win additional prizes or cash by playing a pricing game. After the pricing game ends, a new contestant is selected for Contestants' Row and the process is repeated.

Six pricing games are played on each hour-long episode. Pricing game formats vary widely, ranging from simple dilemma games in which a contestant chooses one of two options to win, to complex games of chance or skill in which guessing prices increases the odds of winning. On a typical hour-long episode, two games are played for a car, one game is played for a cash prize, and the other three games offer expensive household merchandise or trips. Usually, at least one of the six games involves the pricing of grocery items, while another usually involves smaller prizes that can be used to win a larger prize package. On selected Friday episodes were all prizes are cash prizes, all games involve grocery items or smaller prizes.

Originally, five pricing games were in the rotation. Since then, more games have been created and added to the rotation. Some pricing games were eventually discontinued, while others have been a mainstay since the show's debut in 1972. As of 2017, the rotation is among 77 games.

=== Showcase Showdown ===
The game also features two Showcase Showdown rounds, held after all six pricing games have been played (a procedural change starting early in Season 51 tapings; prior to 2021, they were held after the third and sixth pricing games, and on broadcast, it is always broadcast after the third game for the first and sixth game for the second). The three contestants who played each pricing game in each half compete to spin a vertical wheel, known as "the Big Wheel", to determine who will proceed to the show's final round known as the Showcase. The contestants play in the order of the value of their winnings per half (including the One Bid), with the contestant who has won the most spinning last.

The wheel contains 20 sections showing values from 5¢ to $1.00, in increments of five cents. Upon spinning, the contestant may choose to accept the value of the first spin, or take a second spin and accept the combined value of the two. The wheel must make at least one complete revolution, and spins which fail to do so are not counted. After the first contestant has finished spinning, the second and third must beat or tie the value of the first contestant's spin; failure to do so in two spins, or having two spins whose combined value is greater than $1.00, eliminates a contestant from the Showcase Showdown. If the first two players spin over $1.00, then the third player wins by default and has only one spin. Contestants who are unable to spin the wheel on their own are allowed to have another person spin on their behalf. Contestants who achieve an exact score of $1.00 in one or two spins are awarded a cash bonus and a chance to spin the wheel again, known as a "bonus spin". During a "bonus spin", a cash bonus of $25,000 is given if the wheel lands on the $1.00 space again, and $10,000 if it lands on the 5¢ or 15¢ spaces. Ties are broken by an additional spin from each tied contestant. The two highest-scoring contestants of the Showcase Showdown rounds proceed to the final round, known as the Showcase.

For Season 55, Wednesday episodes are designated as "Wild Wheel Wednesdays," where a $1.00 spin is worth $10,000. During a bonus spin, the bonuses are $25,000 for the 5¢ or 15¢ spaces, $100,000 for the $1.00 space, a car for the 55¢ space (for the show's 55th season, and a randomly selected prize for 20¢ (for Drew Carey's 20th season).

=== Showcase ===
At the end of the episode, the two Showcase Showdown winners advance to the Showcase. A package of prizes, referred to as a "showcase", is presented by the announcer and models. Occasionally, prizes may have a common theme, or serve as plot devices within a comedic skit acted out by the announcer and models. The higher-scoring contestant may choose to bid on the showcase, or pass it to their opponent, who must then make a bid. Afterward, a second "showcase" is presented to the other contestant, who must then make a bid. After a commercial break, the host reveals the value of each showcase, with the winner being determined by whoever bid closer without going over the value. Should both contestants' bids be over-valued, neither contestant wins a showcase. A contestant who is within a range ($100 from 1974 to 1998; $250 since 1998) of the value without over-bidding wins both prize packages, known as a "double showcase win". Should the two players tie, both players win their packages.

The 2017 documentary Perfect Bid: The Contestant Who Knew Too Much tells the story of the one contestant who bid the exact price of a showcase, which occurred on an episode taped in September 2008.

== Personnel ==
=== Hosts ===
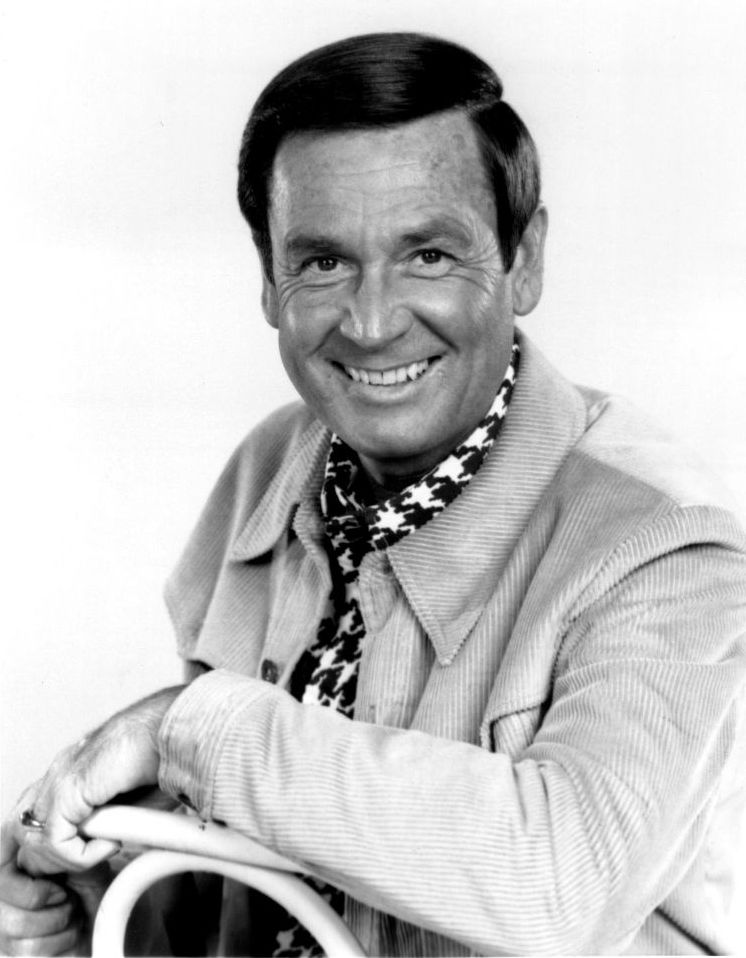
Bob Barker (host from September 4, 1972, to June 15, 2007)

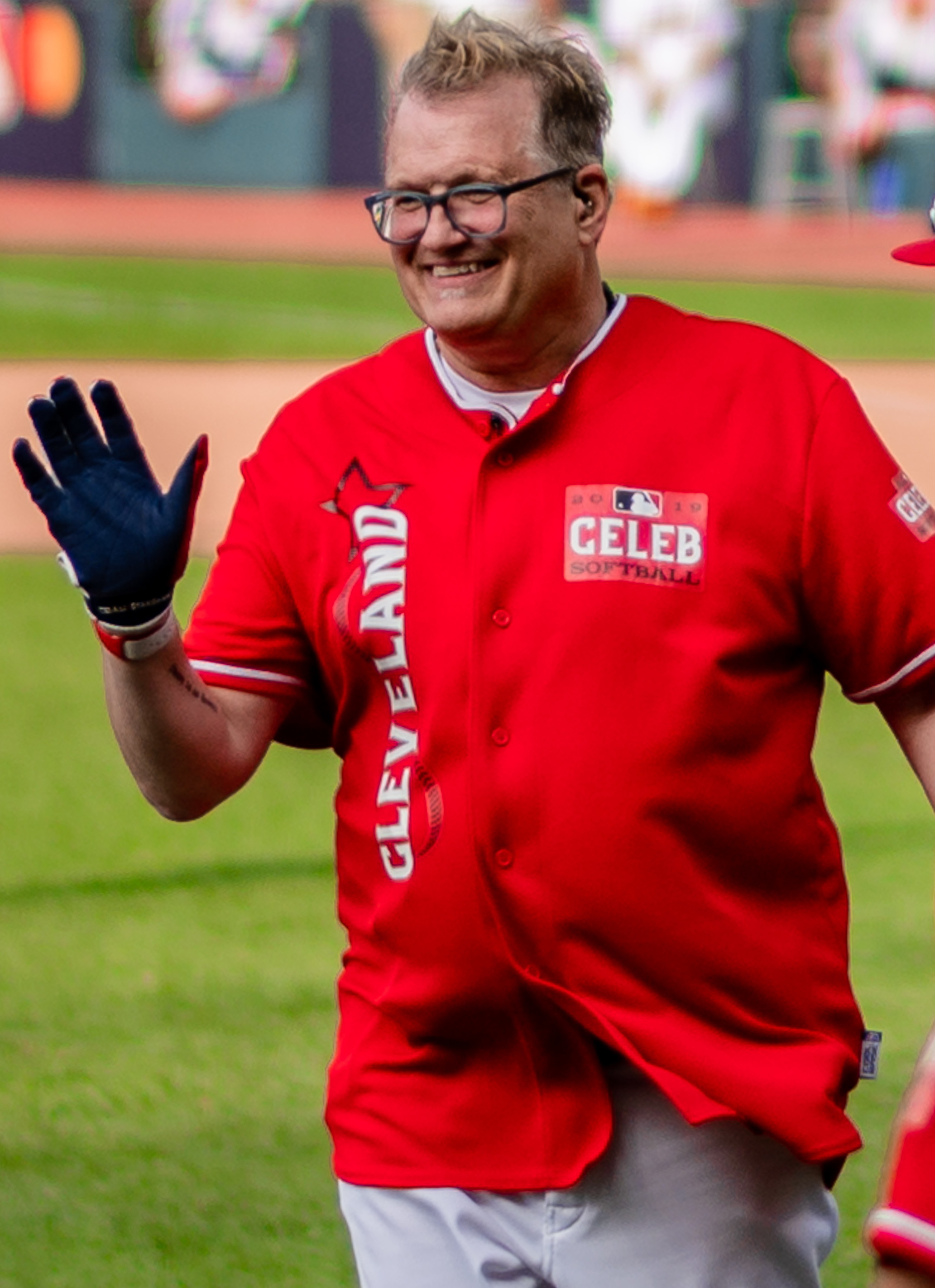
Drew Carey (host since October 15, 2007)

Bob Barker began hosting The Price Is Right on September 4, 1972, and completed a 35-year tenure on June 15, 2007. Barker was hired as host while still hosting the stunt comedy show Truth or Consequences. His retirement coincided with his 50th year as a television host. His final show aired on June 15, 2007, and was repeated in primetime, leading into the network's coverage of the 34th Daytime Emmy Awards. In addition to hosting, Barker became executive producer of the show in March 1988 when Frank Wayne died and continued as such until his retirement, gaining significant creative control over the series between 2000 and his 2007 retirement. He was also responsible for creating several of the show's pricing games, as well as launching The Price Is Right $1,000,000 Spectacular primetime spin-off. Reruns of Barker's final season were aired throughout the summer from the Monday after his final show (June 18, 2007) until the Friday before Drew Carey's debut as host (October 12, 2007), when the season 35 finale was re-aired. During his time as host, Barker missed only one taping of four episodes. Dennis James, then hosting the syndicated nighttime version of the show, filled in for him on these shows in December 1974. In 1981, shortly after the death of his wife Dorothy Jo, Barker became an animal rights advocate and vegetarian, and began signing off each episode with "Help control the pet population, have your pets spayed or neutered." After Barker's retirement, Carey continued the tradition with the same sign-off.

On October 31, 2006, Barker announced that he would retire from the show at the end of season 35. In March 2007, CBS and FremantleMedia began a search for the next host of the show. Carey, who was hosting Power of 10 at the time, was chosen and, in a July 23, 2007, interview on Late Show with David Letterman, made the announcement. Carey's first show aired October 15, 2007. Barker made three guest appearances after Carey took over as host: on the April 16, 2009, episode to promote his autobiography, Priceless Memories; on December 12, 2013, as part of "Pet Adoption Week" that coincided with his 90th birthday; and on the episode which aired on April Fools' Day in 2015, his final appearance on the show, where he hosted the first One Bid and pricing game as part of April Fool's Day.

The 2013 April Fools' show featured Carey and announcer George Gray modeling the prizes while the show's models performed hosting and announcing duties for the day. On the April Fools' Day episode in 2014, Craig Ferguson, Carey's former castmate from The Drew Carey Show, and Shadoe Stevens hosted and announced, swapping places with Carey and Gray, who had performed those roles on the previous night's episode of The Late Late Show. The 2015 April Fools' episode featured the last of Barker's three post-retirement appearances on the show, where he hosted the first One Bid and pricing game before turning it over to Carey.

=== Announcers ===
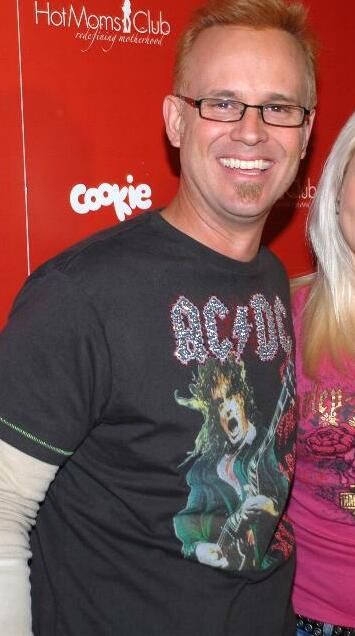
George Gray is the show's fourth announcer and has held this role since December 2010.

Johnny Olson, the announcer for many Goodson-Todman shows of the era, was the program's first announcer until his death in October 1985. Olson was replaced by Rod Roddy in December 1985, who remained with the program until shortly before his death in October 2003. Los Angeles meteorologist Rich Fields took over as the announcer in April 2004 and stayed on until the end of season 38 in August 2010. Following a change of direction and search for an announcer with more experience in improvisational comedy, George Gray became announcer in December 2010, and was permanently made as the show's fourth announcer in April 2011.

During periods in which a permanent announcer was not filling the role, a number of announcers auditioned for the position. In addition to Roddy, Gene Wood, Rich Jeffries, and Bob Hilton auditioned to replace Olson. Burton Richardson, Paul Boland and Randy West substituted for Roddy during his illnesses. In addition to West and Richardson, Daniel Rosen, Art Sanders, Roger Rose, Don Bishop, and Jim Thornton also auditioned for the role eventually filled by Fields. Richardson substituted for Fields while he recovered from laryngitis in December 2006. In addition to Gray, JD Roberto, Jeff B. Davis, Brad Sherwood, David H. Lawrence XVII, and Steve White also auditioned for the role.

=== Models ===
To help display its many prizes, the show has featured several models who were known, during Barker's time on the show, as "Barker's Beauties". Some longer-tenured Barker's Beauties included Kathleen Bradley (1990–2000), Holly Hallstrom (1977–1995), Dian Parkinson (1975–1993), Janice Pennington (1972–2000), and Rachel Reynolds (2003–present). Hallstrom and Parkinson both filed suits against Barker for a hostile work environment; Parkinson withdrew her suit, but Hallstrom's was successful. Pennington, in contrast, had mostly positive experiences with Barker. Following the departures of Nikki Ziering, Heather Kozar, and Claudia Jordan in the 2000s, producers decided to use a rotating cast of models (up to ten) until the middle of season 37, after which the show reverted to a cast of five regular models, increasing to six in 2021. Current models include Rachel Reynolds, Amber Lancaster, Manuela Arbeláez, James O'Halloran, Devin Goda, and Alexis Gaube. Rachel began her tenure with Barker, and is the second-longest running model in show history, trailing only Pennington.

Carey does not use a collective name for the models, but refers to them by name, hoping that the models will be able to use the show as a "springboard" to further their careers. In a change from previous policy, the models appearing on a given episode are named individually in the show's credits and are formally referred as "The Price Is Right models" when collectively grouped at events. Since season 37, the show often uses a guest model for certain prizes, often crossing over from another CBS property or come courtesy of the company providing the prize. Some such models have been male, especially for musical instruments, tools, trucks and motorcycles, and used in guest appearances during the Showcase. Owing to the traditionally female demographic of daytime television shows, along with the pregnancies of Rachel and then-model Gwendolyn Osborne, CBS announced that the game show would add a male model for a week during season 41, fitting with other countries with the franchise that have used an occasional male model. The show held an internet search for the man in an online competition that featured Mike Richards, the show's executive producer, Reynolds, Lancaster, Osborne and Arbeláez serving as judges and mentors during the web series, narrated by Gray. Viewers selected the winner in October 2012. On October 5, 2012, CBS announced that the winner of the male model online competition was Rob Wilson of Boston, Massachusetts. Wilson appeared as a model on episodes through April 15, 2014. A second male model search was conducted in 2014, with auditions taking place during the FIFA World Cup break between May and July 2014. On December 8, 2014, CBS announced that the winner of the second male model online competition was James O'Halloran. A third male model, Devin Goda, debuted on the show in 2018.

=== Production staff ===
The game show production team of Mark Goodson and Bill Todman was responsible for producing the original as well as the revival versions of the game show. Goodson-Todman staffer Bob Stewart is credited with creating the original version of The Price Is Right. Roger Dobkowitz was the producer from 1984 to 2008, having worked with the program as a production staffer since the show's debut after graduating from San Francisco State University. Occasionally, Dobkowitz appeared on-camera when answering a question posed by the host, usually relating to the show's history or records. When he left the show at the end of season 36, Variety reported that it was unclear whether he was retiring or was fired, although Carey indicated in a later interview with Esquire that Dobkowitz was fired.

As of 2011, the show uses multiple producers, all long-time staffers. Adam Sandler (not to be confused with the actor) is the producer and director of the show. Stan Blits, who joined the show in 1980 and Sue MacIntyre are the co-producers. Stan Blits is also the contestant coordinator for the show. In 2007, he wrote the book Come on Down (ISBN 978-0061350115), that goes behind the scenes of the show. In the book he dispels the myth that contestants are chosen at random, and gives readers an inside look at how shows are planned and produced. Kathy Greco joined the show in 1975 and became producer in 2008; she announced her retirement on October 8, 2010, on the show's website, effective at the end of the December 2010 tapings. Her last episode as producer, which aired January 27, 2011, featured a theme in tribute to her. The show's official website featured a series of videos including an interview with Greco as a tribute to her 35 years in the days leading up to her final episode. Frank Wayne, a Goodson-Todman staffer since the 1950s, was the original executive producer of the CBS version of the show. Barker assumed that role after Wayne's death in March 1988. Previous producers have included Jay Wolpert, Barbara Hunter, and Phil Wayne Rossi (Wayne's son). Michael Dimich assumed the director's chair in June 2011. Marc Breslow, Paul Alter, Bart Eskander, and Rich DiPirro each served long stints previously as director. Former associate directors Andrew Felsher and Fred Witten, as well as technical director Glenn Koch, have directed episodes strictly on a fill-in basis. Sandler began directing episodes in 2012, and became the official director in 2013.

Aside from Barker, the show's production staff remained intact after Carey became host. FremantleMedia executive Syd Vinnedge was named the program's new executive producer, with Mike Richards becoming co-executive producer after Dobkowitz's firing. Richards was a candidate to replace Barker as host in 2007, before Carey was ultimately chosen. Richards succeeded Vinnedge as executive producer when the 2009–10 season started, with Tracy Verna Soiseth joining Richards as co-executive producer in 2010. Vinnedge remains credited as an executive consultant to the show. Richards oversaw a major overhaul of the show, dismissing some personnel who had served under Barker and Dobkowitz in an effort to improve the show's performance in key demographics, which continued a change in the demographic of viewers after the movie Happy Gilmore (which featured Barker in a fight). Richards returned to the show for the Barker tribute in August 2023. At the start of the 2013–14 season, FremantleMedia executive Jennifer Mullin joined as a second executive producer, she served in that role until the end of the 2017–18 season when she became the CEO of Fremantle. Richards would stay on until he left the show at the conclusion of the 2018–19 season to join Sony Pictures Television as an executive producer for their game shows. Evelyn Warfel was named executive producer for the 2019–20 season, where she served in that role until the end of the 2024–25 season. John Quinn was then announced as her successor for the 2025–26 season.

== Production ==
=== Audience and contestant selection ===
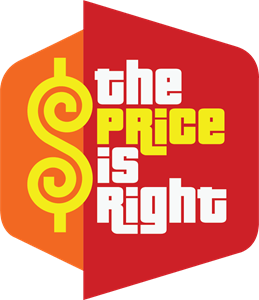
The primary "outline" logo used from Season 36 to Season 49 (2007–2021)

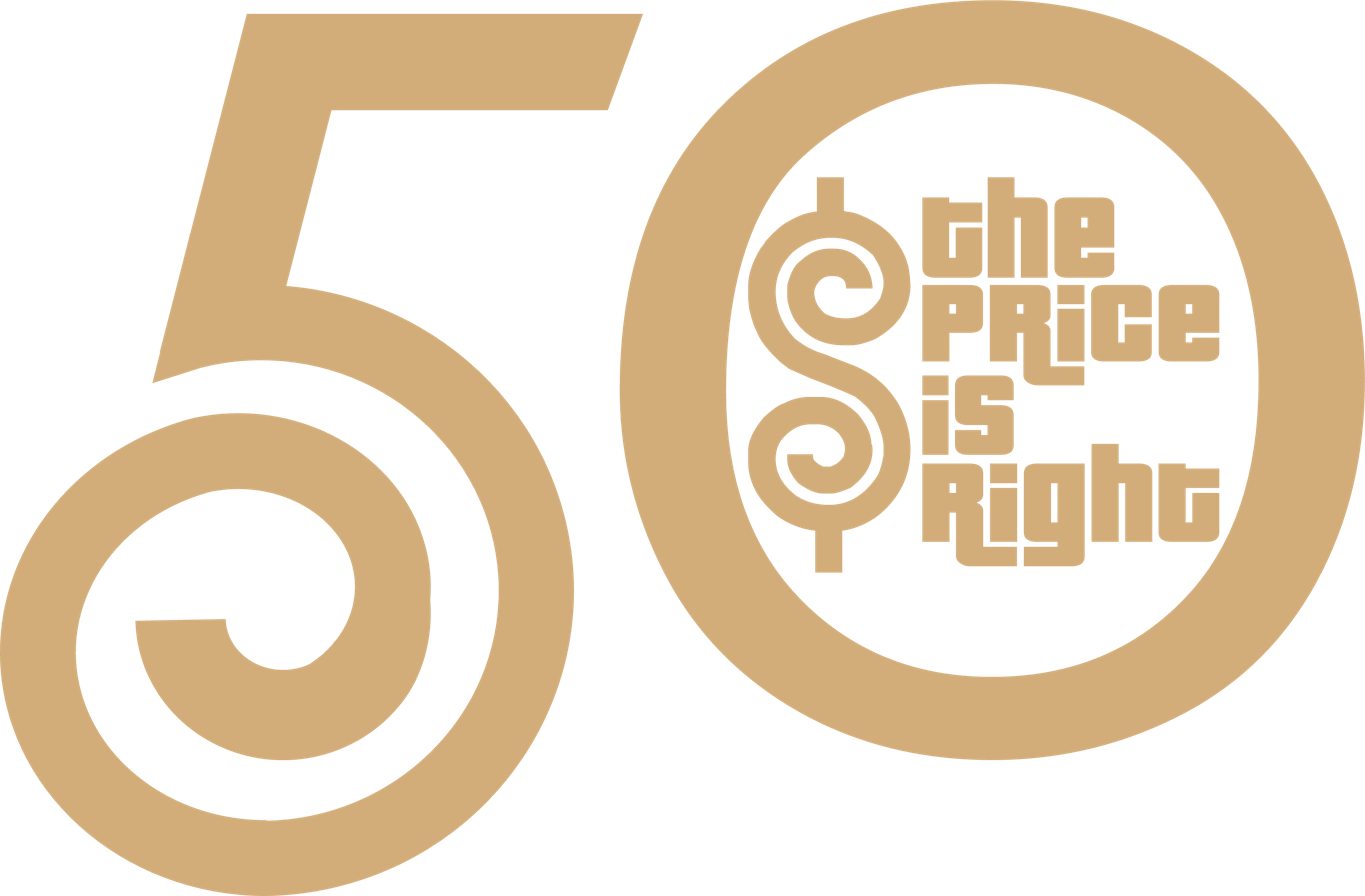
50th Anniversary logo used in Season 50 (2021–2022)

Prior to changes imposed in Season 49 (October 2020), audience members often arrived early on the day of a taping, some even camping out the night before to secure a spot in line. Most had already received tickets for that day's show, although some hoped to get same-day tickets.

Starting in Season 52 with first tapings in July 2023, audience members arrive at Charis Mission Church next door to Haven Studios for a formal process. In the church's meeting rooms, audience members are then given the iconic name tags with a temporary identification number, which are also written on the person's ticket. A Social Security Number (or some national I.D. number for non-U.S. audience members) is also required to be submitted. Audience members are eventually brought through in groups of twelve for brief interviews with the production staff.

Contrary to popular belief, contestant names are not chosen at random; in actuality, the interviews determine the nine contestants from a pool of approximately 100 audience members (reduced from 165 when the show moved to Haven Studios from 2023 to 2026; in Season 50 and 51 (2021–23), it was 50; it was 325 from 1972 to 2020, and players were the only ones allowed on the set in Season 49). Since 1988, the minimum age for audience members has been 18 except for family episodes; prior to 1988, teenagers and children were present in the audience. With few exceptions, anyone at least 18 years old who attends a taping of the show has the potential to become a contestant. Those ineligible include current candidates for political office, employees of Skydance Corporation or its affiliates, RTL Group or any firm involved in offering prizes for the show. Contestants who have appeared on a different game show within the previous year or either two other game shows or any version of The Price Is Right itself within the past ten years are also ineligible.

The show's staff alerts potential contestants – in person, on the show's website and its tickets, themselves – to dress in "street clothes" and not wear any costumes, such as those used to attract attention on Let's Make a Deal, another show that selects contestants from the audience. In June 2008, producers disallowed audience members from wearing fake eyeglasses designed to look similar to those worn by Carey, a restriction that has since been relaxed. Instead, contestants will often wear shirts with hand-decorated slogans. Clothing with logos of the Seattle Sounders FC is restricted, as host Drew Carey is a minority partner in the team, and in accordance with RTL Group Standards and Practices, the show must post disclaimers regarding his ownership stake if a contestant is wearing such logo merchandise. Members of the Armed Forces often attend in uniform, which is mandatory on military-themed special episodes such as Independence Day.

To ensure fair play, cell phones, electronic devices, backpacks, and price lists are not allowed in the holding room or studio. If an audience member has brought any of these items, they must leave them with production for the duration of the taping. Once they clear protocol, they receive a ticket and access to Haven Studios. At the end of the show, audience members return to the church and check out. Starting in Season 55, cell phones will be checked to ensure illegal apps cannot be used if a prospective contestant or audience member is required to have one for medical reasons to control an insulin pump or pacemaker. If that happens, an RTL Standards and Practices official will supervise the contestant to ensure device is used to control the pacemaker or insulin pump and not for illegal usage.

Prospective contestants obtain tickets by contacting a third-party ticketing operator via the show's website, which is promoted on-air during the broadcast. Prior to 2011, ticketing was directly through CBS, originally via mail, with online ticket access added in 2005. The mail practice ended after CBS began outsourcing ticketing to the third-party operator.

Occasionally, episodes are taped with special audiences, including active duty and retired military personnel. Similar primetime episodes were taped in 2002 in the aftermath of the September 11 attacks and in light of the subsequent war in Afghanistan: one honoring each branch of the United States military and a sixth episode honoring police officers and firefighters. An annual military episode has been taped since season 38 in 2008; such episodes were originally broadcast on Veterans Day, but the airdate was moved to Independence Day during season 41 (2013). These episodes feature an all-military audience, a military band playing the winner's service anthem, and contestants being called by rank. The 2008 episode contained a unique rule in which each One Bid featured one contestant from the Army, Navy, Air Force and Marines, and One Bid winners also won a $1,000 gift card. As each contestant won their way onstage, a member of the same branch of service would replace them in Bidder's Row. Most civilian attendees were retired or disabled veterans or family members of military personnel. (The 2009 version eliminated this practice.) Additionally, members from the United States Coast Guard were invited to the show.

Since 2009, some episodes have featured special themes with two contestants competing as teams, such as married or engaged couples for Valentine's Day and the "Ultimate Wedding Shower" episode. Some episodes feature children who are minors (normally not allowed to compete) teamed with a parent (for Mother's Day and Father's Day) or grandparent (for Grandparents Day), as well as teen drivers and students for "Ultimate Spring Break" and "Back to School". In these cases the adult player (not the minor) must make all final decisions in game play, such as when calling numbers or prices.

=== Taping ===
For the first 51 seasons (1972–2023), except for the 2002 30th Anniversary Special, which was taped at Harrah's Rio in Las Vegas, Nevada, The Price Is Right was taped in Studio 33 at Television City in the Fairfax district of Los Angeles. The studio, which is also used for other television productions, was renamed the Bob Barker Studio in the host's honor on the ceremonial 5,000th episode taped in March 1998. When Carey became host, there was talk of the show traveling in the future. The program is usually produced in about an hour, although if there is a guest involved, some tapings will last longer because of question and answer sessions by the audience and the guest, which the host usually moderates. Typically, the show tapes two episodes per day (mid-day and late afternoon tapings) with Monday through Wednesday tapings. The program is taped in advance of its airdate. For example, the show broadcast on February 28, 2008, was taped on January 16, 2008. After resuming tapings in October 2020 following a pandemic-related delay, starting in season 49 (taped behind closed doors with pandemic restrictions with a late start and accelerated taping), three episodes were taped each day, normally with three taping days per week (Sunday through Tuesday, with a morning, midday, and afternoon session). As with many other shows that start production in the summer, the lead time varies during the season, as many as fifteen weeks to as little as one day. The audience is entertained by the announcer before taping begins and in case of guests, the guest will answer questions from the audience. After the taping session, there is a drawing for a door prize. Since Carey took over as host, the show's schedule calls for 190 episodes (38 weeks) in daytime, from late September to Independence Day (July 4), and currently 12 episodes in primetime.

On some episodes, all members of the audience receive a prize from a sponsor or celebrity guest; those prizes are usually mentioned in the Showcase (such as a complimentary slice of Papa John's Pizza, an NHL Winter Classic game puck, a couples' gift box from Hershey's or book authored by a guest). Television and Internet viewers have also been directed to the show's official website to enter a drawing for a similar prize offered to all viewers or another prize related to the special offer (such as the Rock of Ages signed CD). Some episodes are taped "out-of-order" so that a specific episode will air after other episodes have aired. Notably, the Christmas Week episodes are usually taped in early December outside of the regular rotation. An episode may be taped out-of-order if a prize package or episode theme reflects an event that is taking place close to the date that episode will air (primarily with CBS properties such as the NFL, and NCAA March Madness). Other episodes may be aired out of order because of game-related incidents or situations beyond the network's control. Most instances of episodes airing out of order occur when the show is taped far in advance or when a natural disaster recently occurred at a trip venue featured in an episode. A Season 53 episode recorded in June 2024 was broadcast 390 days later in July 2025. A Season 51 episode taped in December 2022 and scheduled to be broadcast in February 2023, was broadcast two months before into Season 52 in November 2023 because of numerous disasters to two trip venues.

On March 8, 2023, it was announced that The Price Is Right would relocate from Television City after season 51 due to the $1.25 billion refurbishment and expansion of the facility by its new owner Hackman Capital. The program will move to Haven Studios, a new facility in the Atwater Village neighborhood of Los Angeles. Sister program Let's Make a Deal will also move to Haven. Taping commenced in late July 2023 from the new studio. Barker died at age 99 on August 26, 2023, almost three months before the last episode ever to be filmed in his namesake studio had aired. On the next scheduled taping on August 28, 2023, segments for a tribute to Barker that aired on August 31, 2023, were filmed at Haven Studios on the new set, marking the first time portions of the new studio were seen on broadcast.

On January 8, 2025, it was announced that The Price Is Right would suspend production due to the wildfires in the Southern California region, where Haven Studios, the filming spot for the show, is located. Production resumed on January 13, 2025.

As Fremantle has been moving their productions outside of California by the start of Season 55 in 2026, primarily to Trilith Studios in Fayetteville, Georgia (where Fremantle productions Press Your Luck and Family Feud are taped, and American Idol 25 is expected to move), production official Randy West confirmed on his Facebook page as CBS and Fremantle costs for filming at Haven Studios have risen that Fremantle is considering to move production of The Price Is Right to Trilith in a future season, where they would share costs with other Fremantle productions.

==== Season 49–51 changes ====
In March 2020, production of The Price Is Right was suspended as a result of the COVID-19 pandemic. On the September 16, 2020, episode of The Athletic's Starkville podcast, Drew Carey informed the podcast that Fremantle intended to resume taping in October 2020 with only essential personnel, including 27 contestants for a given day (nine contestants per show, three shows a day) of taping in the studio. On October 5, 2020, Deadline Hollywood interviewed executive producer Evelyn Warfel about protocol changes for the show. Social media posts from announcer George Gray and model James O'Halloran confirmed that taping had resumed.

Season 49 episodes had a redesigned set with no audience, and Contestants' Row changed to use the wider setup when teams are used to promote social distancing. For season 50 and 51, the show brought back a limited audience of approximately 50 people seated in pods, similar to Let's Make a Deal.

==== Haven Studios changes ====
At Television City, a full audience before the pandemic was about 300 people. The move to Glendale and the new studio, which was implemented in Season 52, led to audience capacity being reduced to 165. Taping days featuring either two or three episodes per day (8:00/11:30 am, and 2:00 pm). Episodes are filmed either Monday to Wednesday or Wednesday to Friday per week, but some weeks have featured four days of taping (9–12 episodes a week). Fremantle will do all contestant briefings and interviews at Charis Mission Church next door. The two CBS Daytime game shows alternated usage of the venue during the season.

In compliance with RTL Standards and Practices, producers prohibit audience members from attending multiple shows on the same date to prevent cheating, as the same prize from one episode may potentially be reused in another episode taped later that day. Under this policy, one of the three episodes to be taped that day is designated a "restricted" taping, as it must feature an entirely new audience that did not attend another taping that day. In Season 52, the restricted taping was the late (2:00 pm) taping, where those in the two morning sessions cannot attend the afternoon session. In early Season 53, which began taping in April 2024, the restricted taping is now the early morning session (8:00) where the audience of that session is not permitted to attend either the mid-morning or afternoon session. Currently, the On Camera Audiences Web site will inform prospective attendees which taping session is the prohibited taping.

The contract with RTL Group and Haven Studios, especially with the time to tape the two CBS Daytime game shows, caused officials to experiment in Season 53 with taping four episodes during January 2025, with shows at 6:30/8:30 am, 12:00 noon, and 2:15 P.M. (sessions would take no more than two hours). That was mostly abandoned because of the wildfires nearby that canceled all but two days of tapings with the experimental format. Those weeks would have featured 12 episodes taped in a week over three days. Instead, when taping resumed after the wildfires were contained, between nine and 12 episodes are taped in a week, three episodes a day, in three or four days. This resulted in the Friday episodes airing from March 7 to May 30 having all six pricing games played for cash, a concept first experimented during the Season 53 primetime premiere. Since Season 54, tapings usually last four days a week, three episodes a day, so the show can complete between 194 to 201 episodes (190 daytime and the primetime episodes) from July to December because of space availability.

=== Prizes ===
Companies donate prizes in exchange for advertising. According to the CBC Radio One series Under the Influence, each episode has a script about 30 pages long, consisting primarily of what is essentially advertising copy. The book Come On Down!: Behind the Big Doors at "The Price Is Right" by staffer Stan Blits says the prizes require acres of warehouse space to store. Since season 37 (2008), the program purchased certain prizes at outlet stores to diversify and upscale the prizes being offered on the show, in an effort to aim at younger demographics (such as college-age students, which has been noted as a popular demographic for the program).

=== Production company ===
The version of the series that began in 1972 was originally "A Mark Goodson–Bill Todman Production" in association with CBS. After Todman died in July 1979, the unit became known as simply Mark Goodson Productions and referred to as such on The Price Is Right from 1984 to June 2007. Today, the series is produced by Fremantle and copyrighted by The Price Is Right Productions, Inc., a joint venture of RTL Group and CBS. For the sake of tradition and through special permission from RTL's subsidiary Fremantle, the show continued to use the Mark Goodson Productions name, logo, and announcement at the end of each episode until Barker's retirement, even after Fremantle purchased and absorbed the Goodson-Todman holdings. The show was credited as a FremantleMedia production from 2007 to 2018; after the company's name change in 2018, it is now credited simply as a Fremantle production.

== Broadcast history ==
The Price Is Right premiered on September 4, 1972, at 10:30 am. ET (9:30 am. CT) on CBS, one of three game shows to debut that day, the other two being The Joker's Wild at 10:00 am. ET and Gambit at 11:00 am. ET. The show was first billed as The New Price Is Right to distinguish itself from the earlier/original version (1956–65) hosted by Bill Cullen, but it proved so popular in its own right that, in June 1973, Goodson-Todman decided to drop the word "New" from its title. On March 26, 1973, CBS moved The Price Is Right to 3:00 pm. ET, pairing it with Match Game as part of what became the highest-rated pairing in daytime, it ran a close second to the NBC soap opera Another World. The show remained in that time slot until August 11, 1975, when it permanently returned to the morning lineup at 10:30 am. ET. Over the next several years, Price would face a variety of game shows on NBC, then, as now, ABC did not program that timeslot, leaving its affiliates to do it themselves.

During the week of September 8–12, 1975, The Price Is Right experimented with a sixty-minute episode format, during what it called "Anniversary Week" (the third anniversary of its premiere). The Anniversary Week included a prototypical circular Showcase Showdown spinner wheel used only for that week of shows. The Anniversary Week experiment was a ratings success, and quickly led to the announcement on September 30, 1975, of the permanent expansion of The Price Is Right to sixty minutes, effective November 3, 1975, its start time moved to 10:00 am. ET. From March 7, 1977, to November 4, 1977, The Price Is Right aired at 10:30 am. It then returned to 10:00 a.m. for just five weeks. On December 12, 1977, the show moved back to 10:30 a.m. and remained there until April 20, 1979, when it assumed the 11:00 am. ET slot where it has remained ever since.

The format of the show has since remained virtually unchanged. New pricing games are generally added each year, while others are retired. In addition, prizes and pricing games have kept pace with inflation, with games originally designed for four-digit prices of prizes (most often cars) adjusted to allow for five-digit prices, such as by providing the first digit of its price for free. While the set has seen numerous redesigns and upgrades over the years, the show has maintained a similar esthetic element since its premiere in 1972.

In season 36, CBS began offering full episodes of the show available for free viewing on the network's website. The show also began broadcasting in high definition with The Price Is Right $1,000,000 Spectacular primetime specials (the normal daytime version continued to air in 4:3 standard definition). The show made the full transition to HD broadcasts beginning with season 37. During the weeks of September 28, 2009, September 20, 2010, and October 4, 2010, two new episodes aired each weekday on CBS. In 2009, the additional episodes filled a gap between the cancellation of the daytime drama Guiding Light and the debut of Let's Make a Deal. In 2010, the extra episodes aired between the cancellation of As the World Turns and the debut of The Talk. The intervening week offered a second episode of Let's Make a Deal. The 2009 second episode aired in the timeslot vacated by Guiding Light at 10:00 a.m. or 3:00 pm. ET/PT, depending on the affiliate's choice. In 2010, the second episode aired in the former As the World Turns time slot, at 2:00 pm. ET/PT. On December 5, 2024, it was announced that reruns of The Price is Right will temporarily fill in the timeslot of the recently canceled afternoon daytime talk show The Talk (which was canceled on December 16, 2024) until the new soap opera Beyond the Gates arrives on February 24, 2025. However, on January 27, 2025, Price reruns were eventually replaced by split repeats of the new CBS primetime Hollywood Squares, owned by the network (unlike Price, owned by RTL Group). which Carey appears in selected episodes. Both The Price Is Right at Night and Hollywood Squares are part of the CBS primetime schedule between Survivor seasons) hosted by Nate Burleson until January 31, 2025.

=== Syndicated productions ===
Three syndicated versions of The Price Is Right have aired. The first two followed the same format as the half-hour daytime version but were intended to air on most stations in the early evening slot before or after local newscasts, and as such, they were referred to by the announcer as "the nighttime Price Is Right."

==== 1972–1980 ====
A weekly syndicated version debuted the week after the daytime premiere and continued to air until September 1980. It was distributed by Viacom Enterprises, which had started as the syndication arm of CBS. When Mark Goodson devised the revival of Price for the 1972–73 season, it was intended for a nighttime broadcast only under new rules for early-prime syndication, and Goodson named Dennis James to host the show. When CBS commissioned a new weekday daytime version, Goodson also wanted James to host that show, but CBS wanted Barker, who was still hosting the syndicated Truth or Consequences at the time, to take it. Barker preferred to host The Joker's Wild, but CBS, again, insisted that he host Price instead.

James eventually hosted a taping day (four half-hour episodes) of the daytime show in December 1974 when Barker fell ill; those episodes were broadcast on and around Christmas Day. James did so concurrently with another daytime hosting gig, on the NBC version of Name That Tune, another revived format from the 1950s.

The two versions were largely similar at the beginning, as both were called The New Price Is Right. Some games had rule differences because of the larger budget and less commercial time on the nighttime show; for example, Double Prices was played for two prizes instead of one.

This version retained the 1972 half-hour format for its entire run and never adopted the daytime show's Double Showcase rule or the Showcase Showdown added to the daytime format when it expanded to an hour in 1975. The word "New" was dropped from the program's name starting in the second season, being titled simply The Price Is Right (as the daytime show was by this time as well) from that point onward, and was often referred to on the air by James and Olson as "the nighttime Price Is Right." In most of the U.S., stations carried the syndicated Price as one of other programs airing in the timeslot (7:30 pm. ET) immediately before primetime which was created by the 1971 FCC Prime Time Access Rule.

Though the nighttime version originally had higher ratings than the CBS daytime version, by 1975, the syndicated ratings started to drop. After the fifth nighttime season in 1977, when the contract with NBC's owned-and-operated stations ended, James's contract was not renewed. CBS's owned-and-operated stations picked the show up and the decision was made to hire Barker, to bring it in line with the daytime version. The series taped its 300th and final episode on March 12, 1980, and was canceled after weekly syndicated game shows had fallen out of popularity in favor of daily offerings (such as Family Feud, which had expanded to daily syndication the same year The Nighttime Price Is Right ended). With a run of eight seasons, it was one of the longest-running weekly syndicated game shows of the era and the longest-running regularly scheduled primetime version of Price (the 1957–1964 version aired seven seasons).

==== 1985–86 ====
Five years later, veteran host Tom Kennedy starred in a new daily syndicated version, which also used the traditional half-hour format and was syndicated by The Television Program Source. Like the previous syndicated series, this version had a slightly larger budget than its daytime counterpart. A perfect bid during the One-Bids originally won that contestant a $100 bonus (like the daytime show did then), but was later increased to $500. This increased bonus permanently carried over to the daytime show in 1998.

Janice Pennington, Holly Hallstrom, and Dian Parkinson all reprised their roles for this series, as did Johnny Olson until his death. Unlike the daytime series, the syndicated series did not employ guest announcers after Olson died and instead named Gene Wood as his replacement. Wood, in turn, was replaced by Rod Roddy shortly after he was named as Olson's successor on the daytime series.

Like its predecessor, this syndicated edition of Price was intended to be aired in the Prime Time Access slots on local stations. However, unlike the 1970s, local stations found themselves bombarded with game shows and other series looking for spots on stations in an increasingly crowded market. It often resulted in shows like Price airing anywhere that they could be fit into a station's programming lineup, such as in the early-morning period or in late-night slots. As a consequence, the show was not able to find its intended audience and the ratings reports reflected that trouble.

Price was no exception, as many of the stations who bought the series placed it in those less desirable slots and the show could not find a foothold against the popular shows of the day, such as the runaway success of the syndicated Wheel of Fortune. Compared to some of the other shows on the market during this period, Price was a modest success, but it did not meet the very high expectations stations and Mark Goodson had for the series. As a result, the show was not renewed beyond its first season. A total of 170 episodes were produced, and they aired in first run from September 9, 1985, to May 30, 1986. During the six years it held the rights to Price, the Kennedy version is the only one of the three syndicated versions that was rerun by GSN.

==== The New Price Is Right ====
Eight years after the cancellation of Kennedy's Price Is Right, a new syndicated version premiered on September 12, 1994, hosted by Doug Davidson (of The Young and the Restless fame) and distributed by Paramount Domestic Television. This series featured several significant changes: eliminating Contestants' Row, a different format for the Showcase Showdown, a Showcase featuring only one contestant, a completely different set, and a much larger budget (even when compared to the two previous syndicated runs) that gave contestants the potential to win up to five times what they could win on the daytime show. However, this version had even more trouble finding an audience than the 1985–86 series did and ended its run on January 27, 1995, after only 16 weeks of first-run shows. Several stylistic elements of this series, as well as many of its music cues, were later integrated into both the daytime version and nighttime specials.

=== CBS primetime specials and series ===
==== 1986–1996 ====
CBS attempted to break NBC's dominance of Thursday night prime time by The Cosby Show and Family Ties with a six-episode summer series, The Price Is Right Special, beginning in August 1986 that could be produced at a lower cost and promote the daytime game show. While it did not do its intended idea, it was the first of numerous primetime series for the game show. On August 23, 1996, CBS aired an hour-long 25th Anniversary Special, using the half-hour gameplay format and featuring a number of retrospective clips. The 30th Anniversary Special was recorded at Harrah's Rio All Suite Hotel and Casino in Las Vegas and aired on January 31, 2002. This one-time road trip enticed 5,000 potential contestants to line up for 900 available tickets, causing an incident that left one person injured.

==== The Price Is Right Salutes ====
A second six-episode primetime series saluting various branches of the United States armed forces, police officers, and firefighters aired during the summer of 2002, as a tribute to the heroes of the September 11 attacks. During the series The Price Is Right Salutes, spinning $1.00 in a bonus spin during the Showcase Showdown was worth $100,000 instead of the usual $10,000.

The primetime episode production codes since 2002 begins with Salutes (#001SP to #006SP); all primetime episodes since then are legally continuations of these episodes.

==== 2003–08: $1,000,000 Spectacular ====
The success of the primetime series, which aired mostly in the summer, along with the vogue of big-money game shows, led to CBS launching another primetime series in 2003 that ran until 2008, titled The Price Is Right $1,000,000 Spectacular. The 2007–08 Writers Guild of America strike and original success in the Nielsen ratings led CBS to commission ten more episodes of the primetime series. This series introduced set changes as the show was broadcast in high definition television for the first time and the set used for these episodes (except for the black floor) was moved to the daytime show in 2008. On the primetime series, larger and more expensive prizes were generally offered than on the daytime show. The Showcase frequently offered multiple or very expensive cars. In the first sixteen $1,000,000 Spectaculars, all hosted by Barker, the payoff for landing on the $1.00 during a bonus spin in the Showcase Showdown was increased to $1 million.

The rules for the $1 million bonus spin were later revised to offer the winner of the Showcase a spin if no other contestant had received a bonus spin in either Showcase Showdown. If both contestants overbid, an audience member was chosen at random to spin the wheel. This rule was again changed so that in the event of a double overbid, the contestant who overbid by the least received the bonus spin for a chance at $1 million.

The million-dollar spin was eliminated in 2008, and instead, contestants were given two ways to win the top prize. One pricing game per episode was selected as a "million-dollar game", with a secondary objective needing to be met for the contestant to win the money. Contestants were also awarded the million-dollar bonus if they managed to win both Showcases, and the range the players had to come within was initially increased to $1,000, then reduced to $500. This format lasted one season (2008), which was made as replacement programming for the 2007-08 Writers Guild of America strike.

==== The Price Is Right at Night ====
In 2016, The Price Is Right returned to primetime featuring cast members of CBS programs and hosts of CBS reality show franchises, including The Amazing Race, Big Brother, and Survivor. The episodes featured fans of the three programs playing alongside past participants from them. In 2019, a retitled version called The Price Is Right at Night featured episodes with cast members from SEAL Team and others with Seth Rogen. Celebrities are paired with civilian contestants competing to win prizes. If there is a celebrity involved, episodes feature charitable donations toward a cause championed by the celebrity guest, with the celebrity joining the civilian contestants during the program. These shows feature a cash equivalent to all prizes won that episode in pricing games donated to the celebrity's charity, and during the second Showcase Showdown, making one spin of the Showcase Showdown wheel, with the value multiplied by 10,000 to be donated to the celebrity's charity. After the shortened season caused by a six and a half-month suspension of production caused by pandemic related shutdowns, Season 49 premiered in October 2020 as a primetime episode, and that season also featured a salute to essential workers in light of the COVID-19 pandemic in the United States, and the cast of The Neighborhood playing as themselves for charity in primetime. The first three episodes of Season 49 were actually primetime episodes that aired weekly before the first daytime episode aired November 16.

An August 2021 announcement detailed a two-hour primetime special The Price Is Right to air on September 30, 2021, in honor of its 50th season. The special featured a retrospective of memorable moments and outtakes from the show's history.

As a result of the labor stoppages with the SAG-AFTRA and Writers Guild of America, CBS announced on July 17, 2023, new episodes of The Price Is Right at Night during the 2023–24 primetime season to add to what is normally scheduled during the season between new seasons of Survivor. The first batch of episodes aired in October 2023, with Let's Make a Deal Primetime airing in November. The first five primetime episodes of season 52 aired on October 2, 9, 13, 20 and 23. On October 18, 2023, the second set of five episodes were announced, featuring Christmas-themed episodes airing in the first week of December (December 4–5 and 7–8, skipping Wednesday because of Survivor and The Amazing Race), and one episode the Monday before Christmas on December 18. The Christmas Week episodes include Office Holiday Party, College Students, Blind Holidate, Holiday Heroes, with the fifth episode being a family-themed episode. A total of 21 episodes were taped in the season, one shy of a normal television primetime season. As such, the series aired seven episodes in Survivor's time slot, commencing with Jackpot January each Wednesday from January 3 to February 21 until the start of Survivor series 46, with additional Jackpot episode on February 2 (a Friday) and except for February 7. Jackpot January added new twists to classic pricing games, with the introduction of a six-digit 3 Strikes using five-digit rules to allow duplication of the first digit, Bullseye played for cash where a player plays with all five grocery products for a doubling cash jackpot each time the contestant makes a correct guess, Money Game where players played for both a car and boat, and a playing of Any Number where the cash in the piggy bank was made larger than the traditional car prize.

The February 7 episode was not Jackpot January, but instead the show's quadrennial Super Bowl themed episode featuring Jason and Travis Kelce remotely introducing their mother Donna Kelce, who presented a Showcase, and the episode's signature prize package of a Super Bowl tickets and travel to the event. The episode was taped January 3, 2024, before the end of the NFL regular season, before Travis Kelce (KC) would play in the game. Starting in 2009-10 season (the first since Carey took over the show in 2007), the show, in association with CBS Sports, features a Super Bowl-themed episode in years CBS carries the game (to the point of having the theme from CBS Sports' NFL coverage temporarily replacing the show's own theme), except in 2020-21 season because of pandemic restrictions where the Super Bowl travel and tickets trip could not be offered. Originally done every three years, starting with the 2023-24 NFL season, the first under new media deals, each of the four major broadcast networks carry the game on a four-year rotation. The next Super Bowl episode is scheduled for the 2027–28 season.

On August 31, 2023, at 8:00 pm. ET, CBS aired a special one-hour program called The Price Is Right: A Tribute to Bob Barker with Carey serving as host. The program was a tribute to the life and career of longtime host Bob Barker, who died from Alzheimer's disease the previous Saturday morning at age 99. The program featured Carey introducing several segments highlighting the greatest moments of Barker's career, including being introduced as host of Truth or Consequences in 1956 and the originally named The New Price Is Right in 1972 as well as the famous movie "brawl" with Adam Sandler in Happy Gilmore all the way to his final three guest appearances after his retirement. It also focused on Barker's advocacy for animal rights and spaying and neutering pets. As of September 2023, this is the only episode to not feature any gameplay, studio audience or other members from the show's cast (including announcer George Gray and the models). Season 52 tapings had commenced in late July 2023, a full month prior to Barker's death, and the special was filmed after a scheduled Season 52 taping day, becoming the first Price-related programming to air from the new studio. Reruns of the program aired on September 4, 2023 (the show's anniversary), and December 12, 2023 (the latter of which would have been Bob Barker's 100th birthday), in the show's customary 11:00 am. ET time slot.

Season 53 premiered with both a daytime and primetime episode on the same day, and with the reduction in episodes for most scripted television shows, the first three weeks of the season started with Monday primetime episodes, each with themes where all six pricing games are played for the same type of prize (cash in the first week, cars in the second week, and trips in the third). Most primetime episodes were broadcast on Wednesdays from December to February between Survivor 47 and 48, and additional episodes to be broadcast in May after Survivor concludes. The Jackpot January format will be used for the winter episodes. On the December 24, 2024, episode ("Holiday Heroes"), Check-Out featured a $20,000 bonus prize if a player could guess exactly the price of any of the five products in the pricing game.

The schedule for Season 54 will remain the same with a primetime season premiere, Jackpot January, and May episodes. The official 100th Episode of the primetime series since May 2002 (since the at Night episode counts begin with the May 2002 military tributes) is also expected in Season 54. (The 1986 series and 2002 Las Vegas episodes do not count in the official production codes.)

On November 28, 2025, it was announced that the sixth season of The Price is Right at Night would premiere on January 7, 2026.

=== Gameshow Marathon ===
On May 31, 2006, The Price Is Right was featured on the series Gameshow Marathon, one of seven classic game shows hosted by talk show host and actress Ricki Lake and was announced by Price's then-announcer Rich Fields. This version combined aspects of the Barker and Davidson versions with the celebrity contestants playing three pricing games, followed by a Showcase Showdown where the two contestants with the highest scores moved on to the Showcase. The winner of the Showcase also earned a spot in Finalists' Row. Fields was the announcer for this version which was taped in Studio 46. It also marked the first Price Is Right episode directed by DiPirro, who replaced Eskander as the director on the daytime show in January 2009.

=== Reruns ===
Game Show Network was the first cable channel to carry reruns of the show from December 9, 1996, to April 3, 2000. These reruns mostly consisted of episodes from the early 1980s along with selected episodes from the show's first ten seasons, episodes from season 15 (1986–87) and season 20 (1991–92), and the 1985–86 syndicated episodes with Tom Kennedy as host. Episodes from before September 1982 (season 11) had to be screened beforehand to eliminate episodes with fur coat prizes at Barker's request, a factor that delayed the show from joining the channel two years after its launch.

Paramount-owned Pluto TV and Fremantle-owned Buzzr announced on November 30, 2020, that a new 24-hour channel named The Price Is Right: The Barker Era would be added to the Pluto TV lineup starting on December 1, 2020. The channel includes episodes of The Price Is Right from the 1980s hosted by Barker, with some episodes airing for the first time since their original air dates. As part of the launch, a selection of holiday-themed episodes from the era aired on Christmas Eve 2020. The channel was added to The Roku Channel on February 8, 2022, and also now appears on Tubi and Xumo Play. Episodes from the 1972–73 season were added into the rotation in November 2023, with those containing fur products remaining banned.

On June 1, 2023, Pluto TV launched another Price channel, which includes episodes from the late 2000s and early 2010s hosted by Carey. This channel has also since expanded to The Roku Channel.

Fremantle had an exclusivity agreement with Paramount Global (now Paramount Skydance), the parent company of CBS and Pluto TV, giving Paramount the rights to all episodes of The Price Is Right from 1972 onward, for this reason, Fremantle could not air Price reruns on Buzzr's over-the-air affiliates, nor could they license out the show to other networks. On May 28, 2024, this exclusivity agreement was lifted, allowing Buzzr to carry The Price Is Right reruns from the Barker era on Buzzr, with episodes culled from the same pool of 1980s episodes as the Pluto TV channel. Buzzr would add further episodes from season 17, featuring Roddy as announcer and a gray-haired Barker, in September 2025.

In Canada, beginning in September 2023, Canadian network GameTV began airing episodes from the 1982–83 season, culled from the same Barker era pool that aired on its Pluto TV channel. In September 2024, the network began airing the half-hour episodes from 1972 to 1973.

== Scientific research ==
The show has attracted attention from economists, who analyze different elements as a natural experiment on strategic decision making.

Several papers focus on the One Bid game. Jonathan Berk and others show that a rational bidder should cut off an existing bid by bidding $1 above it. Pavel Atanasov and coauthors show that fourth bidders are more likely to cut off opposite-gender opponents than members of their own gender.

Studies of the Showcase Showdown test the game-theoretic notion of subgame perfect equilibrium. In game-theoretic terms, The Showcase Showdown is a sequential game of perfect information for which the equilibrium can be found through backward induction. Several papers have solved the optimal strategy for particular spin outcomes. Rafael Tenorio and Timothy N. Cason studied a set of episodes from 1994 and 1995 and found evidence that players under-spin compared to the equilibrium prediction. Recently, a team of economists analyzed 40 years of data and found the same pattern of under-spinning, but only for the contestant who spins first. They found these mistakes are well explained by limited foresight; a sizable fraction of contestants appear to myopically consider the next stage of the game. In line with learning, the researchers found the quality of contestants' choices improves over time.

== Reality web show spinoffs ==
=== Road to Price ===
Road to Price is a six episode reality documentary show aired on the now-defunct CBS Innertube from September 20, 2006, to September 27, 2006. The program featured nine teenage boys driving to Los Angeles in a refurbished mini-school bus as they leave their hometown of Merrimack, New Hampshire to be on The Price Is Right. The episode of The Price Is Right featuring the cast aired September 27, 2006.

=== The Price Is Right Male Model Search ===
Five episodes aired on their official website priceisright.com along with its YouTube page from October 27, 2014, to November 11, 2014. The series was created to replace the first male Price model Rob Wilson as he pursued an acting career in the online version of the ABC daytime soap opera All My Children. During the webisode series, hopeful contestants attempt to be selected as the next male model. Judges included Wilson, Mike Richards, Manuela Arbeláez, Amber Lancaster, Gwendolyn Osborne-Smith, Rachel Reynolds, and former Miss America Shanna Moakler. The three finalists appeared on the CBS daytime talk show The Talk. Online voting determined the winner, and James O'Halloran became the newest cast member. He first appeared on the episode which aired on December 15, 2014. He has since been joined by a third male model, former NFL player Devin Goda, who joined the show during season 47.

== Documentary films ==
- Come On Down, a 1984 BBC produced documentary about American game shows.
- Come On Down! The Game Show Story, a 2014 ITV British documentary mini-series presented by Bradley Walsh.
- Come on Down!, a 2016 documentary about two friends who venture from Boston to Cali to crack the greatest game show in television history.
- Perfect Bid: The Contestant Who Knew Too Much was released on October 13, 2017, and was directed by CJ Wallis and was produced by FortyFPS Productions and MK Ultra Productions. It explores how contestant Ted Slauson became adept at memorizing the prices of the prizes and products on the show since its inception in 1972, culminating in Slauson's helping contestant Terry Kniess bid perfectly on a showcase in 2008. It became one of the biggest controversies in game-show history, and was covered by Time, Esquire, TMZ, and other publications. The film features guest appearances by Bob Barker, Roger Dobkowitz, Kevin Pollak and Drew Carey.
- Dirty Rotten Scandals devoted a two-part episode to the series in 2026, focusing mainly on the accounts of former models Holly Hallstrom, Kathleen Bradley and Claudia Jordan. Dobkowitz and a representative of the Barker estate dismissed the special as an "obvious hit piece" that placed undue weight on Hallstrom's longstanding personal grudge against Barker.

== Prizes ==
As of November 2009, the show had given away approximately $250 million in cash and prizes. Furs have not been offered as prizes since Barker's tenure as host (although wool and leather are now permitted). Several Barker-imposed prohibitions have been lifted since his departure, such as offering products made of leather or leather seats in vehicles and showing simulated meat props on barbecues and in ovens. The show has also offered couture clothing and accessories, featuring designers such as Coach Inc., Louis Vuitton, and Limited Brands in an attempt to attract a younger demographic, as well as backyard play equipment such as JumpSport Trampolines and electronics such as smartphones, personal computer systems, video game systems and entertainment centers. Other prizes which have frequently appeared on the show since its beginnings include automobiles, furniture, trips and cash. The most expensive prize offered on this version of the show was a Ferrari 458 Italia Spider sports car, priced at $285,716, that appeared on the April 25, 2013, episode during "Big Money Week." The prize was offered during the 3 Strikes pricing game. Prior to this, the most expensive prize was a Tesla Roadster (2008) (valued at $112,845), featured on the April 22, 2010, episode in the pricing game Golden Road.

Since Carey took over as host, prizes from Ohio-based companies or companies with major Ohio operations have appeared, as Ohio is the home state of Carey and former announcer Fields. They have included Honda (see below), as well as Jeni's Splendid Ice Creams, which is based in Columbus, Ohio and got its start in Columbus's historic North Market.

=== Automobiles ===
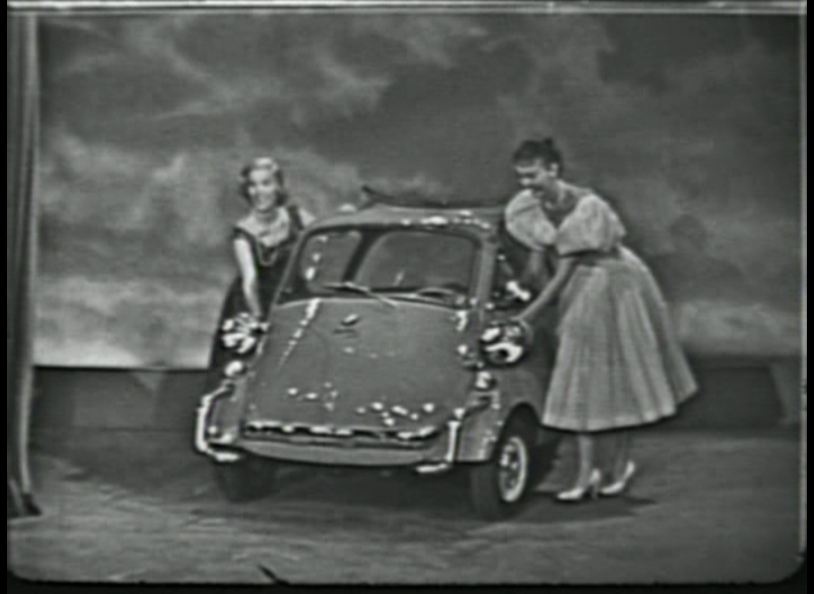
A BMW Isetta being presented as a prize on a 1957 episode of the show

Since the show's debut, automobiles have been a signature prize on The Price Is Right. Most hour-long episodes have two pricing games that are each played for an automobile and in most episodes (although not all), at least one showcase will include an automobile. For special episodes, such as the 5,000th episode, there will often be more cars offered.

From 1991 to 2008, almost all automobiles offered on the show were made by companies based in the United States, specifically Detroit's Big Three (although cars made by these companies' foreign subsidiaries or in a joint-venture with a foreign company were also offered during this era, in all cases badged under an American nameplate). The move was made by Barker, in his capacity as executive producer, as a sign of patriotism during the first Iraq war in 1991 and as a show of support to the American car industry, which was particularly struggling at that time. When Chrysler merged with German automaker Daimler-Benz in 1998 to form Daimler Chrysler AG (now simply Daimler AG after Chrysler split from the automaker, Chrysler later merged with Italian automaker Fiat to form Fiat Chrysler Automobiles and following another merger with French automaker PSA Group to form the Dutch-based Stellantis), the foreign ownership of Chrysler did not affect carrying any Chrysler-related models.

Since Barker's retirement, cars made by foreign companies have been offered, most notably Honda, which has several factories throughout Ohio. Through product placement, certain episodes in 2008 and 2009 featured Honda as the exclusive automobile manufacturer for vehicles offered on that episode. The major European (Volkswagen, BMW, Daimler, Fiat, Polestar, and Volvo) and Asian (Hyundai-Kia, Toyota, Mitsubishi, Mazda, Nissan, Honda, and VinFast) manufacturers have all provided cars on the show since the ban was lifted, with premium foreign cars almost exclusively used for games that generally offer higher-priced cars, such as Golden Road and 3 Strikes. Starting around 2010, vintage and classic cars have occasionally been offered as prizes for games where the car's price is irrelevant to gameplay, such as Hole in One and Bonus Game. Among them have been a 1955 Chevrolet Bel Air and a 1964 Bentley S3.

=== Vacation trips ===
Trips have also been featured many times on the show as awards. These include both domestic trips across the United States, and international trips. Usually, the trips are sponsored by hotels, airlines, as well as tourism companies, which has allowed the program to change from a limited number of locales listed on pre-printed trip skins to video screens that allow any number of places paid for by the sponsoring locale. One frequent trip sponsor during the 1980s was American airline company Western Airlines.

=== Winnings records ===
The record for the largest individual total in cash and prizes on a daytime episode is held by Michael Strouber. On the October 14, 2019, episode, which aired during Big Money Week, Strouber won $202,000 (one $200,000 chip, one zero, and two $1,000 chips) in cash during a playing of Plinko. During the episode, game rules were modified to offer a top prize of $1,000,000, with each chip worth up to $200,000. Strouber walked away with $262,743 in cash and prizes, including a new car, a diamond tennis bracelet and trip to Fiji.

The record for winnings in one, single, daytime pricing game is currently held by Vanesa McCaskill. On the special Mother's Day episode originally aired May 8, 2026, while playing "The Lion's Share", McCaskill won the grand total of $240,150 ($227,500 of which came in cash – two balls worth $100,000, with another worth $25,000, and still another worth $2,500; the remaining $12,650 was the value of the trip to Morocco she also won then), although she was off by the bigger margin in the Showcase round at the end of the episode, preventing her from breaking Strouber's aforementioned record for all-time daytime episode total winnings.

The record for winnings on the primetime show is currently held by Adam Rose. On February 22, 2008, the first The Price Is Right $1,000,000 Spectacular episode since Carey became host, Rose won $20,000 playing Grand Game. By being within $1,000 of the actual retail price of his own showcases, he won both showcases, which included a Cadillac XLR convertible in his showcase and Ford Escape Hybrid in his opponent's, plus the $1 million bonus. Rose's total is also the record for winnings on any version of the Price franchise worldwide, shattering the previous mark set by Joanne Segeviano on the Australian version in 2005.

Terry Kniess holds the record for the closest bid on a showcase without going over, guessing the exact price of the showcase he was given. Kniess, an avid viewer of the show, recorded and watched every episode for four months prior to when he and his wife had tickets to attend in September 2008. Kniess learned that many prizes were repeatedly used (always at the same price) and began taking notes. Kniess was selected as a contestant on September 22, 2008, lost his pricing game (the only contestant to do so that episode), made it to the final showcase and guessed the exact amount of $23,743 for his showcase. Many show staffers, including Carey, were worried that the show was rigged and Kniess was cheating. Kniess later explained that he had seen all three items of the showcase before and knew the general prices in the thousands. The 743 he used because it was his PIN, based on his wedding date and wife's birth month. Kniess' winnings from the show totaled $56,437.

Carey attributed his subdued reaction to the perfect bid by saying, "Everybody thought someone had cheated. We'd just fired Roger Dobkowitz, and all the fan groups were upset about it. I remember asking, 'Are we ever going to air this?' And nobody could see how we could. So I thought the show was never going to air. I thought somebody had cheated us, and I thought the whole show was over. I thought they were going to shut us down, and I thought I was going to be out of a job." Kniess later defended his actions, claiming that he never cheated, and in the end, was awarded his prizes. (his feat can be comparable to the actions of Michael Larson, who appeared on the 1980s CBS game show Press Your Luck, and won $110,237 by memorizing the board sequence).

Two are tied for second with the next closest bid, $1, which happened in 1980 and 2024.

== Reception ==
=== Critical reaction ===
The Price Is Right has generally been praised and remained a stalwart in television ratings over its long history. In a 2007 article, TV Guide named the program the "greatest game show of all time." The introduction of the program ushered in a new era of game shows—moving away from the knowledge-based quiz show format, creating "a noisy, carnival atmosphere that challenged cultural norms and assumptions represented in previous generations of quiz shows."

The show's early reception was not as universally positive, as critics lamented the show's stark departure from the highbrow norms of the Golden Age of Television; original nighttime host Dennis James admitted that even his own housekeeper did not watch the show for that reason, but also defended the series, saying "CBS, who never wanted game shows, just put three game shows on the air, so they know they had better join the fight or lose out, because game shows have a tremendous appeal. The critics will always look down their noses, but you can't have The Bell Telephone Hour on and still stay in competition. If you want to read books, read books." In 1978, Goodson responded to critics who disliked the lowbrow style of his 1970s games by remarking that he was proud of his work in the genre and he gave "game shows the same dedication—perhaps foolishly—that Hal Prince gives to the opening of a Broadway show."

== Lawsuits ==
Since the mid-1990s, the program production company and in some cases the executive producer (both Bob Barker and Mike Richards, the executive producer from 2009 to 2019) have been sued by numerous women. Most of the lawsuits involved models and other staff members in cases of sexual harassment, wrongful termination and racial discrimination. Allegations of sexual harassment brought by Dian Parkinson led to Barker calling a press conference to admit a past consensual sexual relationship with her, while denying any harassment, explaining that she was only angry with him for calling off the relationship. Barker was widowed in 1981 following the death of his wife, Dorothy Jo, but was in a separate long-term relationship with Nancy Burnet (one that would continue until his death) during his affair with Parkinson. It has also been alleged that Barker and senior staff created a hostile work environment, particularly to those who testified for the plaintiffs suing Barker. Responding to the controversy just before his retirement, Barker told William Keck of USA Today, "They have been such a problem. I don't want to say anything about them. They [were] disgusting, I don't want to mention them." The Barker-era lawsuits, except for one, were settled out of court. After Barker dropped his slander suit against Hallstrom, she eventually countersued and received millions in settlement. Former model Lanisha Cole filed a sexual harassment lawsuit against the show's producers in 2011; it was settled in 2013.

The lawsuits for Price affected the popular syndicated game show Jeopardy!, as Mike Richards (who had been named host of the show before resigning in the span of nine days) was executive producer for Price from 2008 to 2019.

== Merchandise ==
The Price Is Right has expanded beyond television to home and live stage shows, and casino-based games.

=== DVD release ===
A four-disc DVD box set, titled The Best of "The Price Is Right," was released on March 25, 2008. The set features four episodes of the 1956–1965 Bill Cullen series, 17 episodes of the Barker 1972–1975 daytime series and the final five daytime episodes hosted by Barker. In accordance with Barker's animal-rights wishes, which remain in effect beyond his retirement, any episodes with fur coats as prizes cannot be aired or released onto home media formats. This includes the first three daytime shows recorded in 1972, plus most of the 1970s syndicated run.

=== Board games ===
Seven board games have been produced. One of them was a variation of a card game, using prizes and price tags from the 1956 version. The second was based more closely on the original version of the show.

Three games were produced during the 1970s by Milton Bradley, with Contestants' Row, some pricing games, and, in the case of the third version, a spinner for the Big Wheel. In the first two versions, decks of cards had various grocery items, small prizes, and larger prizes. The third version simply had cards for each game that included ten sets of "right" answers, all using the same price choices. The instruction book specified what color cards were necessary for each round.

The 1986 version, again by Milton Bradley, was similar in scope to the earlier version, with new prizes and more games, but lacking the Big Wheel. The instruction book refers to Contestants' Row as the "Qualifying Round" and the pricing games as "Solo Games." The book also instructs players to use items priced under $100 as One Bids. The 1998 version of the game, by Endless Games, was virtually identical to the 1986 release, with the same games, prizes, and even the same prices. The only changes were that the number tiles were made of cardboard bits instead of plastic and the cars from the deck of prizes with four-digit prices were removed.

The 2004 version, again by Endless Games, was a complete departure from previous home versions. Instead of different prize cards and games, the game consisted of everything needed to play 45 games and enough materials to create all the games not technically included if the "host" wished to and knew their rules. The Big Wheel spinner was also restored, this time with the numbers in the correct order. Additionally, the prices, instead of being random numbers that could change each time the game was played, were actual prices taken from episodes of the TV show. To fit everything in the box, grocery items and prizes were listed in the instruction book and games were played on dry erase boards. A spinner determined the game to be played next, although its use was not necessarily required if the "host" wished to build his own game lineup, or even use a pricing game not included in the lineup.

=== Computer and electronic games ===
In 1990, GameTek created a Price Is Right video game for MS-DOS, Commodore 64, and other. A handheld Tiger game was made in 1998 with four pricing games. A DVD game with 12 pricing games, live casino show host Todd Newton and video of prizes taken directly from the show was produced by Endless Games in 2005. A 2008 DVD edition, also from Endless Games, featured many changes based on season 36 and included seven new games: Half Off, More or Less, Swap Meet, Secret X, That's Too Much, Coming or Going, and Hole in One. It also featured both host Drew Carey and announcer Rich Fields. CBS.com featured an online Price Is Right-based game in the late 1990s, which was plugged in the closing credits of each episode. The game consisted of choosing which of the four bidders in Contestant's Row was closest to the price of a prize without going over. Additionally, Mobliss provides a suite of pricing games for cellular phones.

On March 26, 2008, Ludia (in connection with Ubisoft) launched The Price Is Right video game for Windows. A version for the Wii and Nintendo DS was released in September 2008. A version for iOS was released in November 2008. The show's then-current announcer, Rich Fields, was the host of the computer version. The virtual set in the game resembled the set used in Seasons 31 to 34. Ludia announced that all three platforms will receive a new version of the video game that was previewed at the Target Bullseye Lounge during the Electronic Entertainment Expo trade show on June 2–4, 2009. The Price Is Right 2010 Edition was released on September 22, 2009. In the fall of 2010, Ludia developed a multi-player version for Facebook. A third Ludia adaptation, The Price Is Right Decades, featuring set designs, pricing games and prizes taken from the 1970s through 2000s, was initially released for the Wii in October 2011, with an Xbox 360 and iOS release following in November and December. The Price Is Right 2010 Edition and The Price Is Right Decades have also been released as downloads within the PlayStation Store for the PlayStation 3 in May 2010 and April 2012, respectively. Irwin Toys released an electronic tabletop version in 2008 featuring Contestant's Row, the Big Wheel, a physical Plinko board with chips, Showcases and seven pricing games. Jakks Pacific released a Plug It in and Play version of The Price Is Right in 2009, featuring Carey and Fields.

=== Slot machines ===
A series of video slot machines were manufactured for North American casinos by International Game Technology. Although gameplay varies by machine, each features themes and motifs from the show, including the Showcase Showdown, with themes used following Carey's start as host. Others feature pricing games as gameplay elements, including Plinko, Cliff Hangers, Punch a Bunch, Dice Game, and Money Game.

=== Scratch-off tickets ===
A scratchcard version of the game is being offered by several U.S. and Canadian state/provincial lotteries, featuring adaptations of Plinko, Cliff Hangers, the Showcase Showdown and the Showcase. The top prize varies with each version.

=== Live casino game ===
After the 30th anniversary episode taped in Las Vegas in 2002, Harrah's and RTL Group began producing live licensed shows (dubbed The Price Is Right Live!) at their venues, with several performers, including Roger Lodge, Marc Summers (who was one of the finalists to replace Barker), Newton, and Gray hosting, with West, Rosen, and Dave Walls announcing.

=== Come on Down Tour! ===
In 2022, the show launched a coast-to-coast tour of live events celebrating the show's 50th anniversary. Contestants had "a chance to play Plinko, spin the wheel, and compete in a Showcase" to win prizes, and had a chance to win an additional $50,000. The tour visited 50 locations and stopped in Los Angeles, Denver, Dallas, New Orleans, Nashville, St. Louis, Cleveland (the hometown of the show's current host Drew Carey) and New York. In October 2022, the tour returned as part of a special weekend event along with the celebration of Carey's 15th season as host sponsored by the Paley Center for Media called PaleyWKND. In addition, Drew Carey, George Gray, and Devin Goda were scheduled to be there in person.
