= CJ Wallis =

Canadian director (born 1981)

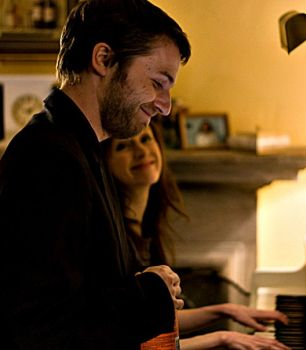
- CJ Wallis on set of Last Flowers
- Born: February 23, 1981 (age 45); Vancouver, British Columbia, Canada
- Occupations: Film director, screenwriter, animator, producer
- Years active: 2006–present
- Website: FortyFPS.com

CJ Wallis is a Canadian director from Vancouver, British Columbia, notable for the film Perfect Bid: The Contestant Who Knew Too Much.

== Career ==
Wallis worked with the Soska sisters on Dead Hooker in a Trunk (2009) and American Mary (2012).

=== Jet Life Recordings (2011–2020) ===
Jet Life manager Mousa Hamdan invited Wallis down to Los Angeles to film a Curren$y concert, "Rock The Bells". After the show ended, Curren$y broke his ankle a month before a 60-day tour featuring Method Man and Big K.R.I.T. The edit from the day "Trust Fall" embedded tweets-as-narrative and was radically different than previous vlog clips produced for the label. Shortly after, Wallis was named "President Of Jet Life Films" and invited onto The Smoker's Club tour. Wallis is responsible for most of the video, design and marketing for the label. Wallis directed over 75+ music videos and 14 hours of documentary footage chronicling the day-to-day life of Curren$y and The Jets, most notably the JetFlix series which debuted on Pitchfork. Curren$y recorded five records in one night over music produced by producer Sledgren. Wallis wrote and produced an original short film called "Revolver" which uses the music and the lyrics to craft an original crime film showing the darker side of New Orleans street life. The film is narrated by Fiend and features Cornerboy P, DJ Duffey, Mr Marcelo, Mousa Hamdan, TY, Young Juve and Lil Soulja Slim in co-starring roles.

=== BB (2014–2018) ===
Wallis wrote and produced the self-financed thriller BB. He selected first-time actors and performed the majority of the film's tasks himself. The film follows a hard-edged girl named Leah Lamont, played by Jennifer Mae, who turns to the world of webcam modelling. Lamont wants to help her girlfriend get money for a plane ticket to Romania to see her ailing family. At the same time, an obsessed fan named Hal Bowman, played by Kristian Hanson, plans a surprise of his own. The film features a soundtrack including Curren$y, Wiz Khalifa, B Real, Lil Wayne, Cornerboy P, Hayley Richman, Rykka, 3d Na'tee.

=== Perfect Bid: The Contestant Who Knew Too Much (2017–2018) ===
The documentary explores how Texas math teacher Ted Slauson became adept at recording and memorizing prices of products featured on The Price Is Right since its inception in 1972. This culminates in Slauson helping a contestant place a perfect bid during a 2008 Showcase Showdown, and ending in one of the biggest controversies in game show history as covered by Time, Esquire, TMZ and more. The film features producer Roger Dobkowitz and presenter Bob Barker. The film won "Best Documentary" at the Orlando Film Festival on October 25, 2017.

=== The Fiddling Horse (2018–2020) ===
The Fiddling Horse is a dark comedy about a woman named who inherits a horse and attempts to elevate her failing social status by using it in a confidence scheme. Produced by Mallory Kennedy and CJ Wallis.

=== Stu's Show (2019–2021) ===
Stu's Show is a documentary about warm-up comedian and TV historian Stu Shostak, Lucille Ball's personal archivist and friend. Shotak meets Jeanine Kasun and enters into a fight for her survival. The film features Dick Van Dyke, Ed Asner and Wink Martindale.

=== Mad Mac - The Memory of Jim McMahon (2020–2021) ===
Mad Mac is a feature-length documentary about two-time Super Bowl champion NFL quarterback Jim McMahon.

== Career ==
=== Feature films ===
Year	Title	Type	Role	Featuring
2022	The Tecmo Bowl	Documentary	Director, Writer, Camera Operator, Producer, Editor, Mix, Marketing	Brad Bell, Nathan Merz, Ben Schwartz,
2021–2022	Mad Mac - The Memory of Jim McMahon	Documentary	Director, Writer, Camera Operator, Producer, Editor, Mix, Marketing	Jim McMahon, Joe Namath, Andy Reid,
2019–2022	Stu's Show	Documentary	Director, Camera Operator, Producer, Editor, Mix, Marketing	Stu Shostak, Jeanine Kasun, Dick Van Dyke, Ed Asner, Wink Martindale
2019–2021	The Fiddling Horse	Feature	Director, Writer, Camera Operator, Producer, Editor, Mix, Marketing	Andy Kindler, Paula Lindberg, Alley Mills, J. Elvis Weinstein, Heather Matarazzo, Billy Mitchell
2017–2019	Perfect Bid: The Contestant Who Knew Too Much	Documentary	Director, Camera Operator, Animation, Producer, Editor, Mix, Marketing	Ted Slauson, Bob Barker, Roger Dobkowitz
2014–2017	BB	Feature	Director, Writer, Camera Operator, Producer, Editor, Mix, Marketing	Jennifer Mae, Kristian Hanson, Victoria Fox

=== Short films ===
Year	Title	Type	Role	Featuring
2009	Last Flowers	Short	Writer, Director, Producer, Editor, Marketing	Joseph May, Sarah Slean
2006	Circumference	Short	Writer, Director, Producer, Editor, Marketing	William MacDonald, Joseph May

=== Television ===
Year	Title	Type	Role	Featuring
2007	969	Daily Youth Television, MTV	Writer, Director, Producer, Editor	Chris Van Vliet, Lauren Toyota, Joel Herrod

=== Music videos ===
Year	Title	Artist	Album
2023	"One Bird Calling"	Ron Sexsmith	The Vivian Line
2023	"When Our Love Was New"	Ron Sexsmith	The Vivian Line
2022	"Diamond Wave"	Ron Sexsmith	The Vivian Line
2022	"What I Had in Mind"	Ron Sexsmith	The Vivian Line
2022	"Avatars of Love"	Sondre Lerche	Avatars of Love
2021	"Are We Alone Now"	Sondre Lerche	Patience
2019	"Garage Talk"	Curren$y & Wiz Khalifa	2009
2019	"Stoned Gentlemen"	Curren$y & Wiz Khalifa	2009
2019	"Plot Twist"	Curren$y & Wiz Khalifa	2009
2019	"67 Turbo Jets"	Curren$y	Cigarette Boats
2018	"300 Thousand"	Curren$y	Fire in the Clouds
2018	"Wit My Left"	Fendi P & Lil Wayne	
2016	"Dope Boys"	Curren$y & Rick Ross	
2016	"Intermission Part 2"	Cornerboy P	
2016	"Six Figures"	Cornerboy P	
2016	"The Mack Book"	Curren$y	The Carrollton Heist
2016	"I'll Be Your Crime"	Hayley Richman	Internet Single
2015	"Friday the 13th"	Cornerboy P	
2015	"Keepin Lean"	Cornerboy P	
2015	"Regal Music"	Cornerboy P	
2015	"Wedding Ring"	Cornerboy P & Curren$y	
2015	"Winners Neva Lose"	Cornerboy P	
2015	"All Wit My Hands"	Curren$y	Canal Street Confidential
2015	"Superstar"	Curren$y & Ty Dolla Sign	Canal Street Confidential
2015	"Boulders"	Curren$y	Canal Street Confidential
2015	"Winning"	Curren$y & Wiz Khalifa	Canal Street Confidential
2015	"Lowriders at the Nightshow"	Curren$y	Canal Street Confidential Freestyle Series
2015	"Jason"	Curren$y	Canal Street Confidential Freestyle Series
2015	"Cars"	Curren$y	
2015	"Rhymes Like Weight"	Curren$y	
2015	"Sidewalk Show"	Curren$y	
2015	"Intro"	Mr. Marcelo	OgLuvDatOg3
2015	"Round My Way"	T.Y.	Son of a Gangsta 2
2015	"Young Ballers"	T.Y.	Son of a Gangsta 2
2014	"Cassette Deck"	Cornerboy P	Don P
2014	"AD 4"	Curren$y	
2014	"$ Migraine"	Curren$y & Le$	
2014	"Break Bread"	Roddy	
2014	"Certified"	Roddy	
2014	"While the Gettin Good"	Roddy & Curren$y	
2013	"Box Chevy"	Cornerboy P	
2013	"Holy Water"	Cornerboy P	
2013	"New Jet City"	Curren$y	New Jet City
2013	"Kingpin"	Curren$y	Internet SIngle
2013	"These Bitches"	Curren$y & French Montana	New Jet City
2013	"Living for the City"	Curren$y	New Jet City
2013	"Mary"	Curren$y	New Jet City
2013	"Molly Gras Intro"	Dee Low	
2013	"Know What It's Like"	Fiend	
2013	"I Know What I'm Doin"	Roddy	
2013	"504 Radio"	Roddy & 3D Na'Tee	
2013	"This One"	Roddy	
2012	"15 Rackz"	Cornerboy P	
2012	"Lighter Please"	Cornerboy P	
2012	"Biscayne Bay"	Curren$y	Cigarette Boats EP
2012	"WOH"	Curren$y & Styles P	Cigarette Boats EP
2012	"Leaving The Dock"	Curren$y	Cigarette Boats EP
2012	"Showroom"	Curren$y	The Stoned Immaculate
2012	"Capitol"	Curren$y & 2 Chainz	The Stoned Immaculate
2012	"Fast Cars, Faster Women"	Curren$y & Daz Dillinger	The Stoned Immaculate
2012	"What It Look Like"	Curren$y & Wale	The Stoned Immaculate
2012	"Livin'"	Curren$y	
2012	"What Da Fuck x Cruiselife"	Curren$y	
2012	"Christmas Tree (Lit)"	Fiend	
2012	"Mirror"	Fiend	
2012	"Champagne"	Fiend & Curren$y	
2012	"The Plot"	Roddy	
2012	"My War"	The Scarlet Ending	
2011	"Fade Away"	Cornerboy P & Trademark & Dee Low	
2011	"The Stitch-Up of Bloody Maryr"	Elective	Internet Single
2011	"Blackie"	Rykka	Kodiak
2011	"The Rose"	Sarah Slean	The Baroness Redecorates
2010	"Bothered at All"	Malcolm & The Moonlight	Internet Single
2010	"Exactly What You Want"	The Scarlet Ending	Ghosts
2010	"Phoenix"	The Scarlet Ending	Ghosts
2010	"Epiphany (Live)"	The Scarlet Ending	Ghosts
2010	"Sinner (Live)"	The Scarlet Ending	Ghosts
2009	"Angel Lust"	Fake Shark - Real Zombie!	Meeting People Is Terrible
2006	"Sad Girl Radio"	The Awkward Stage	Heaven Is for Easy Girls
2006	"Misguided"	Marnie Mains	

=== Collaborations ===
Year	Title	Type	Role	Featuring
2009–2011	American Mary	Feature	Producer (uncredited), Marketing & Development.	Katharine Isabelle
2007–2010	Dead Hooker in a Trunk	Feature	Lead actor, Editor, Camera Operation, All Post-Production, Score	Jen Soska, Sylvia Soska, Rikki Gagne, CJ Wallis

== Awards and nominations ==
- 2019 - "Best Comedy" - Hollywood Weekly Magazine Film Festival (WINNER, "The Fiddling Horse", CJ Wallis)
- 2019 - "Best Feature" - Golden Gate International Film Festival (WINNER, "The Fiddling Horse", CJ Wallis)
- 2019 - "Best Feature" - Gulf Coast Film Festival (WINNER, "The Fiddling Horse", CJ Wallis)
- 2017 - "Best Documentary Feature" - Orlando Film Festival (WINNER, "Perfect Bid", CJ Wallis)
- 2016 - "Best Director Of The Year" - NOLA Hip Hop Awards (Nominated, CJ Wallis)
- 2015 - "Best Director Of The Year" - NOLA Hip Hop Awards (Nominated, CJ Wallis)
- 2015 - "Best Video Of The Year" - NOLA Hip Hop Awards (Nominated, "Round My Way" - T.Y.)
- 2011 - "Best Music Video Of The Year" - Leo Awards (WINNER, "The Rose" - Sarah Slean)
- 2009 - "Best Screenwriting in Short Drama" - Leo Awards (Nominated, Last Flowers)
- 2006 - "Best Youth or Children's Program or Series" - Leo Awards (WINNER, "969")
