= See No Evil (2006 film) =

- Theatrical release poster
- Directed by: Gregory Dark
- Written by: Dan Madigan
- Produced by: Vince McMahon; Joel Simon
- Starring: Kane; Christina Vidal; Michael J. Pagan
- Cinematography: Ben Nott
- Edited by: Scott Richter
- Music by: Tyler Bates
- Production companies: WWE Films; (Eye Scream Productions)
- Distributed by: Lionsgate
- Release date: May 19, 2006
- Running time: 85 minutes
- Countries: Australia; United States
- Language: English
- Budget: US$8 million
- Box office: US$18.8 million

See No Evil is a 2006 slasher film directed by Gregory Dark, written by Dan Madigan, produced by Joel Simon, and starring professional wrestler Kane (Glenn Jacobs). The first major film produced by WWE Films, it was shot at Warner Roadshow Studios, Gold Coast, Australia. The original working title of the film was Eye Scream Man, but was later changed to The Goodnight Man, then Goodnight before settling on See No Evil.

See No Evil was released on May 19, 2006, by Lionsgate. The film was panned by critics and grossed $18.8 million against a budget of $8 million. A sequel, titled See No Evil 2, was released on DVD on October 21, 2014.

== Plot ==
Officer Frank Williams and his partner Blaine investigate an abandoned house, where they find a young woman with her eyes ripped out. A large figure with an axe then murders Blaine, whilst Frank has his arm chopped off before he is able to shoot the attacker in the head. Afterward, detectives find seven bodies in the house, all of which have had their eyes ripped out.

Four years later, Frank and his partner, Hannah, take a group of delinquents (Christine, Kira, Michael, Tyson, Zoe, Melissa, Richie, and Russell) to clean the abandoned Blackwell Hotel to turn it into a homeless shelter, as explained by the owner, Margaret.

That night, while Michael, Zoe, Russell, and Melissa go upstairs to the penthouse, Tyson and Richie decide to look for the previous owner's safe and find what appears to be the body of a recently deceased man. Richie panics and runs off, only to be dragged into an elevator with a hook by Jacob Goodnight. When Margaret mentions that the elevator is being used, Hannah goes to check on the group, but is killed in the elevator. Christine tries to help Kira escape the hotel, but Jacob attacks Kira with his hook and drags her into a dumbwaiter. Christine and Frank go upstairs to find the others and run into Tyson, who tells them what happened to Richie. Frank realizes it must be Jacob and is then pulled into the ceiling by the hook and killed.

Kira is held hostage by Jacob because of her religious tattoos and is kept captive in a cage where she witnesses Richie having his eyes torn out. Melissa and Russell go off into a room on their own, but are chased by Jacob. Russell tries to lower Melissa out of a window, but he is killed by Jacob. Then, Jacob drops Melissa out of the window. She survives her fall, but then she is killed by a pack of stray dogs. Jacob then attacks Michael and Zoe. Zoe nearly escapes from Jacob, but her cell phone rings, alerting Jacob to her location. He subsequently kills her by forcing the cell phone down her throat. Michael finds Christine and Tyson as they try to rescue Kira, but Jacob attacks them again, knocking Michael out while the other two escape up the elevator shaft.

The pair find Kira but are interrupted by Jacob before they can release her. Tyson creates a distraction but is electrocuted with his own taser and crushed with the bank vault. Margaret then shows up, and reveals herself as Jacob's mother, who lured Frank back to the hotel to get revenge on him for shooting her son, and explains the prisoners are merely a "bonus". Margaret attempts to shoot Kira, but Jacob intervenes and throws her headfirst into a nail on the wall. Michael reappears to help the girls battle Jacob, and the trio is eventually able to stab him through the eye with a pipe and throw him out of a window, where his heart is impaled by a shard of glass, seemingly killing him. The film ends with Michael, Kira, and Christine leaving the hotel.

== Cast ==
- Kane as Jacob Goodnight
  - Sam Cotton as Young Jacob Goodnight
- Christina Vidal as Christine Zarate
- Samantha Noble as Kira Vanning
- Luke Pegler as Michael Montross
- Michael J. Pagan as Tyson Simms
- Rachael Taylor as Zoe Warner
- Penny McNamee as Melissa Beudroux
- Craig Horner as Richie Bernson
- Mikhael Wilder as Russell Wolf
- Steven Vidler as Officer Frank Williams
- Cecily Polson as Margaret
- Tiffany Lamb as Hannah
- Corey Parker Robinson as Officer Blaine
- Annalise Woods as Young Girl
- Zoë Ventoura as Eyeless Woman

== Release ==
To promote the film, a novelization by Dan Madigan was published by WWE Books in April 2006.

The film was released on May 19, 2006.

== Reception ==
=== Box office ===
See No Evil grossed US$15 million in North America, and US$3.8 million in other territories for a worldwide total of US$18.8 million placing it at a rank of 166 globally, against a budget of US$8 million.

In North America, See No Evil was projected to gross US$4.6 million from 1,257 theaters in its opening weekend (19 May 2006), placing the film 6th among film box office receipts, where the top box office for the weekend was The Da Vinci Code. It ended up grossing US$15 million.

=== Critical response ===
On the review aggregator website Rotten Tomatoes, 9% of 56 critics' reviews are positive, with an average rating of 3.20/10. The website's consensus reads: "See No Evil is packed with cliches from countless other teen slasher films, making for a predictable, scare-free waste of time." Metacritic, which uses a weighted average, assigned the film a score of 17 out of 100, based on 14 critics, indicating "overwhelming dislike". Audiences polled by CinemaScore gave the film an average grade of "B−" on an A+ to F scale.

== Home media ==
See No Evil was released on DVD on November 28, 2006, and grossed US$46 million. In Australia, See No Evil was released on May 28, 2008.

The DVD release included audio commentary by writer Dan Madigan, director Gregory Dark and co-executive producer Jed Blaugrund, as well as Kane, who portrayed Jacob Goodnight in the film.

== Sequel ==
On August 6, 2013, WWE Studios announced a sequel to the film, with Kane reprising his role as Jacob Goodnight, the Soska Sisters directing and Danielle Harris, Katharine Isabelle, Chelan Simmons, Kaj-Erik Eriksen, Greyston Holt, Lee Majdoub and Michael Eklund having joined the cast.

Filmed in Vancouver, British Columbia from late September 2013 to early October 2013, See No Evil 2 was released on DVD on October 21, 2014.
