= Rabid (2019 film) =

Film by Jen and Sylvia Soska

- Theatrical release poster
- Directed by: Jen Soska; Sylvia Soska
- Written by: Jen Soska; Sylvia Soska; John Serge
- Based on: Rabid by David Cronenberg
- Produced by: John Vidette; Paul LaLonde; Michael Walker
- Starring: Laura Vandervoort; Benjamin Hollingsworth; Phil Brooks; Stephen McHattie
- Cinematography: Kim Derko
- Edited by: Erin Deck
- Music by: Claude Foisy
- Production companies: Back 40 Pictures; Telefilm Canada; Ontario Creates
- Distributed by: A71 Entertainment
- Release dates: August 26, 2019 (FrightFest); January 31, 2020 (Canada)
- Running time: 110 minutes
- Country: Canada
- Language: English

Rabid is a 2019 Canadian body horror film co-written and directed by Jen and Sylvia Soska and starring Laura Vandervoort, Benjamin Hollingsworth, Phil Brooks, and Stephen McHattie. It is a remake of the 1977 film directed by David Cronenberg.

The film premiered at the London FrightFest Film Festival on August 26, 2019. It was released theatrically in Canada on January 31, 2020, by A71 Entertainment.

== Plot ==
After a young fashion designer, Rose, suffers a disfiguring accident, she undergoes an experimental stem cell skin and tissue graft treatment performed by Dr. William Burroughs.

Rose ends up attacking several people, as a parasite emerges from her face leading to a form of rabies where minutes to hours later her victims transform. Meanwhile, the fashion designer Gunter decides Chelsea, Rose's best friend and a fashion model, will launch Rose's first exhibition. Brad, a fashion photographer who formerly dated Rose, reenters her life.

After the epidemic spreads and Chelsea kills Gunter and is shot by police, Brad and Rose go to Dr. Burroughs to check on anomalies in her skin graft. Once there Burroughs traps both in a room and he reveals he told Brad about her parasite, and Burroughs's wife—who was his first subject—is revealed to be supplying the supposed stem cell tissue. She had cancer years before and ultimately died leaving a mindless immobile shell of tissue behind.

Brad is attacked by Burroughs's wife and the parasite inside Rose, which Burroughs believes will unlock immortality in humans. Rose uses Brad's knife to cut her parasite proboscis off and both her and Brad appear to die, but when Rose recovers, Burroughs announces plans to keep Rose captive for research, having cured the rabies pandemic.

== Cast ==
- Laura Vandervoort as Rose Miller
- Ben Hollingsworth as Brad, a fashion photographer
- Ted Atherton as Dr. William Burroughs
- Hanneke Talbot as Chelsea, Rose's best friend
- Mackenzie Gray as Gunter, a fashion designer
- Stephen McHattie as Dr. Michael Keloid
- Phil Brooks as Billy
- AJ Mendez as Kira
- Kevin Hanchard as Dr. Riley
- Greg Bryk as The Director
- Stephen Huszar as Dominic

== Production ==
In February 2016, Jen and Sylvia Soska were hired to direct a remake of David Cronenberg's 1977 horror film Rabid, with producers Michael Walker, Paul LaLonde and John Vidette. The film had entered pre-production by February 2018, during which time the Soskas described the project as a continuation of the "thoughts and conversation" from the original and "modernized through a female perspective". In May 2018, Laura Vandervoort was cast as the film's protagonist, Rose.

The film was produced by Back 40 Pictures in conjunction with Telefilm Canada and Ontario Media Development Corporation, and was financed by The Royal Bank of Canada, Media Finance Capital.

Principal photography began in July 2018 in Toronto.

== Release ==
Rabid premiered at the London FrightFest Film Festival on August 26, 2019. The film held its US premiere on October 15, 2019, at Screamfest Horror Film Festival in Los Angeles.

Distribution rights were acquired by A71 Entertainment in Canada, Shout! Studios in the United States, 101 Films in the United Kingdom, and Madman Entertainment in Australia and New Zealand. The film was released in select theaters, digitally, and on video on demand in the US on December 13, 2019. In Canada, Rabid was released theatrically on January 31, 2020. It was released on DVD and Blu-ray on February 4, 2020.

== Reception ==
On the review aggregator website Rotten Tomatoes, the film holds an approval rating of 55% based on 31 reviews, with an average rating of 5.7/10. The website's critics consensus reads, "Rabid reimagines David Cronenberg's original narrative with clear reverence and a fresh aesthetic, but despite its biting first half, ultimately devolves into a fairly conventional genre exercise."
