= Perfect Bid: The Contestant Who Knew Too Much =

2017 documentary by CJ Wallis

- Film poster
- Directed by: CJ Wallis
- Produced by: CJ Wallis; Mallory Kennedy
- Cinematography: CJ Wallis
- Edited by: CJ Wallis
- Distributed by: Gravitas Ventures
- Release date: October 13, 2017 (BendFilm Festival)
- Running time: 72 minutes
- Country: United States
- Language: English

Perfect Bid: The Contestant Who Knew Too Much is a 2017 American documentary film that profiles Ted Slauson, an elementary school mathematics teacher and super fan of The Price Is Right. Interviews with Slauson reveal how he became fascinated with the show in the early 1970s, which drove him to memorize the prices of products, and report his supposed involvement with contestant Terry Kniess, who bid perfectly on a showcase in 2008 and denied that Slauson assisted him.

== Synopsis ==
Ted Slauson spent his early life documenting and memorizing the prices of the prizes on The Price Is Right. When he turned 18, Slauson started traveling to the show to become a contestant. Even when he was not picked from the audience to be a contestant, Slauson yelled out prices—which is allowed—helping contestants win cash and prizes on the show.

Over many years, Slauson called out prices to contestants, allowing them to submit the exact price – or "perfect bid" – on various items, and claimed that he helped a contestant make a "perfect bid" on the final showcase, helping them win both showcases (a feature of the game), totaling tens of thousands of dollars. Prior to that, he claimed that he had helped two other contestants bid within a small margin of error on the final showcase, which also allowed them to win both showcases, per a feature of the game.

After Terry Kniess made the "perfect bid" to win the double showcase of prizes, the show's producers finally started increasing and changing the diversity of items used on the show, including changing the options packages that impact the prices on automobiles, which are the highest priced single items available for the contestants to price, making it less likely that a contestant can remember the prices by simply watching the show over a long period.

Though Kniess maintained that he came up with the perfect bid on his own, Slauson claimed otherwise.

== Cast ==
- Theodore (Ted) Slauson
- Bob Barker
- Roger Dobkowitz

While Slauson, Barker and Dobkowitz were expressly interviewed for the film, there is also archive footage of Drew Carey discussing the incident with Kevin Pollak, from an episode of Kevin Pollak's Chat Show.

== Critical reception ==
The film has received positive reviews. Review aggregator Rotten Tomatoes currently has the film listed "fresh", holding a 100% score based on 6 critical reviews.

== Awards ==
Perfect Bid: The Contestant Who Knew Too Much won best documentary at the Orlando Film Festival in 2017.

== Bibliography ==
- Wallis, CJ (writer, director, producer), Kennedy, Mallory (producer), interviewees: Slauson, Theodore; Barker, Bob; Dobkowitz, Roger (December 15, 2015). Perfect Bid: The Contestant Who Knew Too Much (YouTube). Vancouver, Los Angeles.
