= Michael J. Pagan =

American actor and screenwriter (born 1985)

- Born: Michael Jamon Pagan; January 12, 1985 (age 41); United States
- Occupations: Actor, screenwriter
- Years active: 1995–2014

Michael Jamon Pagan (born January 12, 1985) is an American actor and screenwriter. Pagan is best known for appearing in How Stella Got Her Groove Back (1998), where he received an NAACP Image Award nomination and the Disney Channel Original Movie Up, Up and Away (2000).

== Biography ==
He attended Long Beach Polytechnic High School, Verbum Dei High School in Los Angeles and West Los Angeles College. Pagan has received training at the Tasha Smith Acting Studio and the Ivanna Chubbuck Studio.

Pagan appeared as Sam, the nephew of Denzel Washington's character, in thriller Fallen (1998). That same year, he was Angela Bassett's son, Quincy, in romantic comedy How Stella Got Her Groove Back. A reviewer for The Hollywood Reporter opined Pagan gave a "winning" performance. For playing Quincy, Pagan earned an NAACP Image Award nomination for Outstanding Youth Actor in 1999.

He portrayed Malik Sawyer in the 1998 television film Killers in the House. Pagan played the lead character, Scott Marshall, in the Disney Channel Original Movie Up, Up and Away (2000). In the film, Scott is the only member of his superhero family who does not have any powers.

After appearing in an episode of Black Scorpion (2001), Pagan took a four-year hiatus from acting. He resumed his acting career with a guest spot on The Shield (2005). Pagan appeared in two sports films, playing Roger in Gridiron Gang (2006) and Kurt in Forever Strong (2008). Pagan's guest roles include One on One (2006), CSI: Crime Scene Investigation (2009) and Cold Case (2009).

Pagan portrayed Tyson "Tye" Simms in the slasher film See No Evil, returning in its 2014 sequel See No Evil 2. He co-wrote the horror film Chain Letter (2010) alongside Deon Taylor, acting in the film as well. Pagan has not acted since 2014.

== Filmography ==
- Fallen (1998)
- How Stella Got Her Groove Back (1998)
- Rusty: A Dog's Tale (1998)
- Killers in the House (TV) (2000)
- Up, Up and Away (TV) (2000)
- The Gospel (2005)
- See No Evil (2006)
- Gridiron Gang (2006)
- House of Fears (2007)
- The Hustle (2008)
- Forever Strong (2008)
- Nite Tales: The Movie (2008)
- Chain Letter (2010)
- Diary of a Champion (2009)
- Mississippi Damned (2009)
- See No Evil 2 (2014)

== See also ==
- Jordan Calloway
- Rome Flynn
- China Anne McClain
- Jeremy Pope
