= Elisabeth Rosen =

Canadian actress

- Occupation: Actress
- Years active: 1992–

Elisabeth Rosen is an actress and director.

== Biography ==
In 1992, her career began with her appearing in four episodes of both Neon Rider and The Odyssey TV series. She has appeared as a guest star in many Canadian and US produced TV series, including Stargate SG-1 and Caprica. She has also performed in many TV movies, such as The Eleventh Victim and The Hunt for the Unicorn Killer.

Rosen is the niece of playwright and author Beverley Rosen Simons.

== Filmography ==
=== Films ===
Year	Title	Role
1998	Babyface	Lisa
1998	Sanctuary	Jinx
2000	Bless the Child	New Dawn Kid
2002	Heart of America	Dara McDermott
2003	House of the Dead	Skye
2004	Lucky Stars	April
2011	Comforting Skin	Tattoo
2011	In the Name of the King 2: Two Worlds	Seer
2012	The ABCs of Death	Mrs. Van Arrant
2016	Warcraft	Westfall Woman
2017	Cult of Chucky	Madeline

=== Television shows ===
Year	Title	Role	Notes
1992	Neon Rider	Mary	4 episodes
1993	The Commish	Carla Stone	Episode: "Hero"
1994	The X-Files	Katie	Episode: "Red Museum"
1992–1994	The Odyssey	Gypsy / Styrene	4 episodes
1995	The Outer Limits	Nadia Torrance	Episode: "If These Walls Could Talk"
1995	Eye Level		TV movie
1996	My Mother's Ghost	Jessie Locke	TV movie
1996	Are You Afraid of the Dark?	Margot	Episode: "The Tale of the Night Shift"
1996	Sliders	Melanie White	Episode: "The Young and the Relentless"
1997	The Sentinel	Lisa Hughes	Episode: "Blind Man's Bluff"
1998	Rescuers: Stories of Courage: Two Families	Irene Caroli	TV movie
1999	Murder in a Small Town	Sophie Carter	TV movie
1999	The Hunt for the Unicorn Killer	Jean Marie	TV movie
1999	Traders	Briann Cunningham	Episode: "History Lesson"
1999	Due South	Eloise Barrow	Episode: "Say Amen"
1999	Psi Factor: Chronicles of the Paranormal	Tanya Norton	Episode: "School of Thought"
1999	Twice in a Lifetime	Young Madeline Flynn	Episode: "Sixteen Candles"
2000	Miracle on the Mountain: The Kincaid Family Story	Carla Kincaid	TV movie
2001	Da Vinci's Inquest	Project Life Counsellor	Episode: "Birds Have Been at Her"
2001	Ruling Class		TV movie
2001	Stargate SG-1	Jennifer Hailey	Episodes: "Prodigy", "Proving Ground"
2003	The West Wing	Diane Halley	Episode: "Red Haven's on Fire"
2010	Caprica	Kolibri	Episode: "The Dirteaters"
2011	Possessing Piper Rose	Ashley Henderson	TV movie
2012	The Eleventh Victim	Celia	TV movie
2014	The Tomorrow People	Ultra Agent / Agent Mills	Episodes: "Sitting Ducks", "Endgame"

== Bibliography ==
- "Elisabeth Rosen". TV.com. Archived from the original on September 6, 2011. (minimal information)
