= Ice Twisters =

2009 Canadian-American television film

- Promotional poster
- Written by: Andrew C. Erin
- Story by: Paul A. Birkett; Andrew C. Erin
- Directed by: Steven R. Monroe
- Starring: Mark Moses; Camille Sullivan; Alex Zahara; Chelan Simmons; Kaj-Erik Eriksen
- Music by: Michael Richard Plowman
- Countries of origin: Canada; United States
- Original language: English

Production
- Executive producers: Breanne Hartley; Paul Hertzberg; Lisa M. Hansen
- Producer: Kirk Shaw
- Cinematography: Anthony Metchie
- Editor: Asim Nuraney
- Running time: 83 min.
- Production companies: Insight Films; CineTel Films

Original release
- Network: Syfy
- Release: November 14, 2009

Ice Twisters is a Canadian-American made-for-television science fiction-disaster film that was directed by Steven R. Monroe and aired on Syfy on November 14, 2009.

== Plot ==
A research team, including Joanne, Damon, Gary, and Phil, deploy small UAVs from a C130 Hercules, to interfere with a storm. At first the group celebrate a good result; however, a large storm begins to develop.

Meanwhile, Charlie, an ex-scientist, is in town to promote his new book, with his assistant Nora in Harrisford, Oregon. As Charlie does a book signing at a local book shop, the storm hits the town. Charlie and Nora narrowly escape death; however, the storm kills many others.

Just outside town, a young couple Eric and Ashley are traveling to meet with Charlie as part of their university course. Eric notices a strange weather pattern, but Ashley takes no notice, as she is in a rush to get to the book signing. In town, Nora is taken to hospital for injuries while Charlie meets up with his old friend Joanne and also Damon, who have rushed to the scene after their computers detected the storm.

Joanne wishes to stop the program and so orders Damon to phone their backer Frank. However, Frank tells Damon he will not stop the experiment until it has been completed and so allows the small UAVs to continue flying. Meanwhile, another storm freezes a farmer. Charlie, Joanne and Damon rush to the scene where they discover that one of the UAVs that has crashed. Joanne tells Charlie about the experiment. Nora then phones Charlie. She is leaving town for the TV show Charlie has an appearance on later that day. Meanwhile, Eric and Ashley arrive at the book signing to discover that it has finished and begin to leave town.

Charlie, Joanne and Damon travel back to their experiment site, where they meet up with Gary and Phil. Charlie comes up with a theory of how the UAVs are causing the storms, and Damon tells Joanne that Frank has not aborted the experiment. Angrily, Joanne phones Frank to warn him, but Frank rejects her calls. As Eric and Ashley leave town, a tornado forms. Nora's car is hit by a train locomotive sucked up by the storm. After the tornado disappears, Eric and Ashley walk back to town. At the experiment site, another tornado hits. The group flee but Phil is killed. They go to a nearby hotel where they discover that Frank has blocked them from deactivating the UAVs. Eric and Ashley break into a building where they decide to change their presentation to the freak weather after Eric caught it on camera.

The group come across wreckage where they discover Nora's body. A furious Joanne blames Damon for not making Frank finish the experiment. As Charlie mourns Nora's death, another storm hits, forcing the group to flee. After a plane that Frank sent into the sky crashes, he wishes to deactivate the UAVs; however, Bill informs him that they are not responding. The group travel to the same building Eric and Ashley are at, and Gary begins to try and deactivate the UAVs. They realize that the storms will reach populated areas very soon and warn Frank, who allows the UAVs to be destroyed. However, the storm continues to grow despite the UAVs having been destroyed. While Eric and Ashley send out signals to warn people, Charlie, Joanne and Damon rush to the university to use its satellite to punch a hole in the ozone layer to extinguish the storms, while the ice twister strikes Portland. While arriving, Damon is killed by large hailstones. Meanwhile, Gary manages to connect to a satellite in space. The plan works and the storms are extinguished.

Eric and Ashley help Charlie and Joanne put Frank in prison for manipulating the team into creating a weapon.

== Cast ==
- Mark Moses as Charlie Price
- Camille Sullivan as Joanne Dyson
- Alex Zahara as Damon Jarwell
- Ryan Kennedy as Gary
- Kaj-Erik Eriksen as Eric
- Luisa d'Oliveira as Ashley
- Chelan Simmons as Nora Elman
- Robert Moloney as Frank O'Neil
- Dion Johnstone as Bill
- Nicholas Carella as Phil
- Ingrid Mila Torrance as Dra. Austin
- Jeremy Radick as Book Geek
- Garvin Cross as Farmer Oullette
- Rob Hayter as Guard

== Home media ==
The film was released on DVD by First Look Home Entertainment on April 13, 2010.

== Reception ==
"This made-for-TV movie retains a niche spot among weather-disaster enthusiasts for its chilly thrills.”, wrote Harper Brooks. while Barbara James stated, ”Confusing at best, Ice Twisters is a poorly written and structured story about the consequences of messing with Mother Nature with modern-day science and trying to interfere with nature's plans. Low-budget and poorly received by the general audience, Ice Twisters is hardly a good watch, as it barely teeters on the edge of excitement. Ice Twisters is no different from the average tornado movie, just less impressive.”

A review found ”While it never strays too far from the cheap and tatty basics of the Syfy Channel disaster movie, it does make the characters work with a certain degree of wit and sparkle. There is Mark Moses as the meteorologist turned author who is constantly making sardonic suggestions and rankling the regular scientists of the group. (The script makes a number of digs about him being a hack writer of a series of disaster novels about improbable meteorological scenarios, which treads a fine line given that Ice Twisters is itself a hack B budget meteorological disaster movie based around a scientifically improbable premise).”
