= See No Evil 2 =

2014 American slasher film

- DVD cover
- Directed by: Jen and Sylvia Soska
- Written by: Nathan Brookes; Bobby Lee Darby
- Based on: Characters by Dan Madigan
- Produced by: Michael Luisi
- Starring: Danielle Harris; Katharine Isabelle; Kaj-Erik Eriksen; Michael Eklund; Chelan Simmons; Greyston Holt; Glenn "Kane" Jacobs
- Cinematography: Mahlon Todd Williams
- Edited by: Mark Stevens
- Music by: The Newton Brothers
- Production companies: WWE Studios (See No Evil Films 2, Inc.)
- Distributed by: Lionsgate Home Entertainment
- Release date: October 21, 2014
- Running time: 90 minutes
- Country: United States
- Language: English
- Box office: $1.6 million

See No Evil 2 is a 2014 American slasher film directed by the Soska sisters, written by Nathan Brookes and Bobby Lee Darby, produced by Michael Luisi, and starring Danielle Harris, Katharine Isabelle and the WWE professional wrestler Kane. It is the sequel to the 2006 feature film See No Evil. Unlike the original, which had a theatrical release, the film was released in 2014 on a direct to Blu-ray and DVD form.

== Plot ==
Amy prepares to leave her job at the city morgue while Seth and their boss Holden work the graveyard shift. As Amy is leaving to meet friends at a bar for her birthday, Holden receives news that a number of bodies are being delivered, the victims of a mass murder committed by Jacob Goodnight at the Blackwell Hotel. Amy decides to cancel her plans and help her colleagues with the deliveries. Amy and Seth process the corpses, including Goodnight's. As Amy leaves Seth to finish the work, she is surprised to find Holden has allowed her friends Tamara, Kayla, Carter, and her brother Will to throw a birthday party in the morgue. During the party, Will warns Seth to stay away from Amy, believing she deserves better than him, prompting Seth to leave and return to work. Will tells Amy he disapproves of her dropping out of Med School to work in the morgue, angering her, who also leaves the party.

Tamara, who is fascinated by death and serial killers, leaves the party with Carter to go look at Jacob's body. The experience of being in a room with the body of a real murderer arouses her, and she and Carter begin to have sex. Jacob suddenly awakens and kills Carter while Tamara escapes. Jacob searches the room, outfitting himself with a burn victim mask and several surgical tools before cutting the building's electricity.

Hearing Tamara's screams, the rest of the partygoers attempt to find her; Holden, away from the rest, is captured and mortally wounded by Jacob.

Amy, Will, Kayla, and Tamara acknowledge their predicament and attempt to reach the upper levels of the hospital, only to find Jacob blocking their way at every turn. Seth arrives with the keys to open a locked emergency stairwell, but Jacob is behind him and attacks them, causing the group to split up. Kayla seeks refuge in a bathroom, where Jacob strangles her. When Kayla mutters "Thank God!" at Jacob's hesitation, he relives old memories, remembering the abuse he suffered at the hands of his religious mother. As Kayla dies from her injuries anyway, Jacob asks her, "Why would God help you?" before setting off in search of the remaining members of the group.

Jacob kills Tamara and captures Will, using him as bait to lure Seth and Amy into a trap, where he proceeds to execute her brother. In the resultant confrontation, Seth is wounded by an electric knife; Amy takes him into a room to cauterize the wound, where she reveals that she dropped out of medical school after realizing the inevitability of death. Noticing that one of the windows leads to ground level, Amy kisses Seth for the first time, then squeezes out to get help. Finding Jacob in the parking lot, however, she retreats back inside. Afterward, Jacob stabs her to death as she attempts to unlock a side exit door. After fighting Jacob, Seth impales him with the nozzle from a piece of embalming equipment and pumps his body full of embalming chemicals, seemingly killing him.

Seth escapes the morgue through a broken window and drives away in his car. As he stops to open the gated entrance, he realizes that not only is Jacob still alive, but also that he was in the car with him. Jacob attacks Seth from behind and gouges out his eyes, killing him.

The final shots of the film show each dead member of the cast before a final close-up shot of Jacob's face as he says, "I see it now", referring to their sins.

== Cast ==
- Kane as Jacob Goodnight
- Danielle Harris as Amy
- Katharine Isabelle as Tamara
- Kaj-Erik Eriksen as Seth
- Chelan Simmons as Kayla
- Greyston Holt as Will
- Lee Majdoub as Carter
- Michael Eklund as Holden
- Annalise Woods as Girl
- Sylvia Soska as Corpse
- Jen Soska as Corpse
- Cecily Polson as Margaret

== Production ==
The movie was announced in August 2013, with Kane set to reprise his role as the murderous Jacob Goodnight and the Soska sisters to direct. The Soskas claimed their desire in taking on the film was to "take the character [Jacob Goodnight] and bring him to the level of Michael Myers and Freddy Krueger and Jason Voorhees."

On September 16, 2013 Danielle Harris, Katharine Isabelle and Michael Eklund joined the main cast. On September 20, 2013 it was announced Greyston Holt, Chelan Simmons, Kaj-Erik Eriksen and Lee Majdoub had been cast.

Filming began on September 23, 2013 in Vancouver, British Columbia and ended on October 11, 2013. Filming predominantly took place at Riverview Hospital in Coquitlam. Harris, Isabelle and Simmons reportedly performed all their own physical stunts. The trailer was released on July 25, 2014.

== Release ==
In June 2014 it was reported the movie would not be released to theatres, instead being released to video on demand on October 17, 2014, followed by a Blu-ray release on October 21, 2014.

== Reception ==
The film received an approval rating of 60% on review aggregator Rotten Tomatoes, based on 5 reviews with an average score of 5/10. William Bibbiani, writing for CraveOnline, praised the film's adherence to traditional slasher movie conventions, saying that "...it is indeed comforting to see that the standard, straight-up slasher yarn still has some life in it. Instead of playing to some sort of house style, like many of the recent slasher remakes were determined to do, See No Evil 2 looks pleasingly grim and icy and dark. What’s more, it plays with genre expectations while playing the genre’s actual conventions somewhat straight..."

Bloody Disgusting gave the film a mixed review, praising the film's characterization and first act, but saying that "once Jacob Goodnight begins stalking the halls everything slows to a crawl. Maybe it’s because the environment was so generic, or maybe it was because it’s not a franchise I care to see continue on...". Nonetheless, the review concluded that "I wish this were a standalone sequel instead of being forced into a corner in trying to continue the events from 8 years ago. But as it stands, See No Evil 2 is a fun little VOD rental for your Halloween festivities."

Ryan Larson, writing for ComingSoon.net, gave the film an average rating saying "While some of the movie is enjoyable due to standard gore splashed slasher fare, for the most part you can't help but think 'haven't I seen this already?'"

Dread Central's Scott Hallam gave the film a mixed review praising the directors, Jen and Sylvia Soska, but calling the script "a cookie-cutter slasher" ultimately summing up his review with "If you’re in it for some cool kills done by a cool killer as seen through the eyes of the Twisted Twins and you don’t mind the fact that the story is pretty typical, you’ll dig See No Evil 2."

=== Retrospective analysis ===
In a 2019 retrospective of the careers of Jen and Sylvia Soska, Steve Wandling of Horror Obsessive discussed See No Evil 2 as part of the directors' transition from independent filmmaking to studio productions. He argued that the film retained their distinctive filmmaking style while allowing them to further develop their action and slasher filmmaking techniques.

In his 2024 book The Metamodern Slasher Film, film scholar Steve Jones examined See No Evil 2 as an example of contemporary slasher filmmaking that combines nostalgia for the genre's earlier conventions with attempts to reinvent them. Jones discussed the Soska sisters' efforts to reimagine Jacob Goodnight as a modern slasher villain, highlighting their approach to subverting established character stereotypes and audience expectations while drawing inspiration from 1980s horror films.

== Awards and nominations ==
Year	Award	Category	Recipient(s)	Result	Ref.
2014	Fright Meter Awards	Best Supporting Actress	Katharine Isabelle	Nominated	
2015	BloodGuts United Kingdom Horror Awards	Best Actor	Kaj-Erik Eriksen	Nominated	
2015	Fangoria Chainsaw Awards	Best Supporting Actress	Katharine Isabelle	Write-in	
