= Hellevator =

American horror game show (2015–2016)

- Genre: Horror; Game show
- Presented by: Jen and Sylvia Soska
- Country of origin: United States
- Original language: English
- No. of seasons: 2
- No. of episodes: 12

Production
- Executive producers: Jason Blum; Todd Lubin; Jay Peterson; Daniel Soiseth; Shye Sutherland; Jonathan Fox; Joel Relampagos
- Running time: 60 minutes
- Production companies: Blumhouse Television; Matador Content; Electus; Lionsgate Television

Original release
- Network: Game Show Network
- Release: October 21, 2015 – October 28, 2016

Hellevator is an American horror game show produced by Jason Blum for his Blumhouse Productions banner and Todd Lubin in which a team of three contestants rides a haunted elevator through an abandoned slaughterhouse. The show is hosted by Jen and Sylvia Soska and premiered on October 21, 2015, on Game Show Network. The debut episode was watched by 503,000 viewers.

The four episode second season began airing October 7, 2016, at 9:00 p.m. A team of four players begins the game, one is taken from them at the beginning of the show and placed in a cell designated as the Inferno.

== Gameplay ==
Each episode centers around a legend whose central figure committed horrific deeds, generally torture and/or murder of multiple victims. The challenges in each episode are based on that legend.

=== Individual challenges ===
In Season 1, a team of 3 contestants participate in the game. In Season 2, a team of 4 contestants participate in the game although one of them is locked up in the Inferno at the start. The contestants usually have a common bond (nurses, college students, models, chefs, etc,). The Soska sisters tell the contestants in the Hellevator part of the legend. The subsequent challenge relates to that part of the legend. In Season 2, the overall legend relates to three of the Seven Deadly Sins, with each of the challenges relating to one of those three sins. The team members decide among themselves who will face that challenge, with each contestant having to take one of the three challenges. The contestant chosen exits the elevator and makes their way to the challenge area (they are usually told to follow the light that guides them). On the way there, they are usually either startled by sounds or actors intimidating them; or kidnapped by robed figures and taken to the challenge area.

Once the contestant arrives, the Soska sisters tell them the rules of the challenge as well as how much time they have to complete it. While the contestant is performing the challenge, he or she may be distracted by such things as the challenge environment (for example, the room may get hotter as the challenge progresses, or certain actions may result in the contestant being covered in blood or other substances) and actors either screaming or actively antagonizing the contestant. In some challenges, the Soska sisters will provide clues either at the start or during the challenge to the contestants inside the Hellevator to help their teammate. The contestants are equipped with walkie-talkies so that the contestants still in the elevator can offer advice during the challenge. There is also a video screen inside the Hellevator to provide visuals as well as for necessity at times for the team to help the contestant doing the challenge. In order to win the money assigned to the challenge and remain in the game, the contestant must complete the challenge successfully and return to the Hellevator within the time limit of three or four minutes (five or seven minutes in Season 1) (not completing the challenge or doing it incorrectly will deny the contestant a return to the Hellevator). The first challenge is relatively easy and is worth $5,000, the second challenge is more difficult and is worth $10,000, the third challenge is the hardest and is worth $15,000. For Season 2, the values of the individual challenges were reduced to $2,000, $3,000, and $5,000 respectively.

If the contestant fails to complete the challenge and return, he or she is eliminated from the game. In Season 1, eliminated contestants were out of the game completely and suggested to have met a horrific death related to the challenge (in reality, they exited the slaughterhouse, and do not participate in the interview at the end of the show). In Season 2, the contestants who failed to complete the challenge were sent to the cell called The Inferno where they had to remain until they could be rescued by their teammate(s) in the final challenge.

Once the three challenges have been played, the remaining contestants face the Labyrinth (Season 1) or the Inferno Run (Season 2).

== Season 1 ==
=== The Labyrinth ===
Prior to the Labyrinth, the remaining members of the team surrender their walkie-talkie before exiting the Hellevator and are given a bag in which they place any money found. The Labyrinth consists of three areas designed to relate to the legend and/or the challenges featured in the show, each with a certain amount of cash hidden within. Also hidden somewhere in the Labyrinth is a special item, generally said to be the key to defeating the central villain of the legend, if found, this item is worth an additional bonus to the team. The amount of cash and the bonus total $20,000. In order to keep the money earned in the Labyrinth, the team must complete the entire run in the Labyrinth and return to the Hellevator within the time allocated of five minutes. If the team fails to do so, they forfeit the money.

If all three contestants had successfully completed their challenges, an alternate version of the Labyrinth was used instead of the traditional three-area format. In this alternate version (which was only used once), the team had to complete one final group challenge and return to the Hellevator within five minutes. There was no bonus item in this version, but during the final challenge, the team could find money bags worth $1,000 each, however, the team could only keep the additional money if they completed the task and returned to the Hellevator in time. In this version of the Labyrinth, there was a total of $25,000 available.

A team that plays a perfect game by completing all three challenges and finding all of the money and the bonus item in the Labyrinth will win a total of $50,000 to $55,000.

=== Episodes ===
| No. overall | No. in season | Title | Original release date |
|---|---|---|---|
| 1 | 1 | "The Undertaker" | October 21, 2015 |
Team YOLO enter the funeral home of the Undertaker, who isn't content to let his clients rest in peace. Challenges to earn prize money are "Dead Ringers", "Show Your Guts", a visit to the crematorium, and "The Labyrinth".
| 2 | 2 | "The Asylum" | October 28, 2015 |
Three junkies named Christian, Yoni and Jessica go through crazy challenges in Nurse Brixton's hospital.
| 3 | 3 | "House of Trapped Souls" | November 4, 2015 |
3 nursing students face off against a haunted house built atop a graveyard for prisoners. The challenges faced are "Bodies in the Basement", "Pearls of Wisdom", "The Writing's on the Wall", and the Labyrinth.
| 4 | 4 | "Murder Castle" | November 11, 2015 |
Three friends of Andrea, Andre & Michael face off against the deadly hotel created specially to murder victims of the real life serial killer H. H. Holmes. Challenges include "Peek-a-Boo", "Strip Show", "Vaulted", and the Labyrinth where they searching for cash and the murder castle's blueprint.
| 5 | 5 | "Triplets" | November 18, 2015 |
Three friends of Brian, Kati & Irene from Massachusetts brave the evil triplet Jamie, Edgar & Addicus themed Hellevator. They must find a mask in a classroom, escape from chains and a straight-jacket while one of the triplets looms, and braves tar and ash in a dark tunnel before attempting to assemble a block puzzle to seal the grave of one of the triplets. The lucky ones brave the labyrinth searching body bags for cash and a body of Edgar.
| 6 | 6 | "The Bunker" | December 2, 2015 |
| 7 | 7 | "Carnival Carnage" | December 9, 2015 |
| 8 | 8 | "Butcher, Baker, Candlestick Maker" | December 16, 2015 |
Two friends got dragged by another friend into Hellevator as they discover the secret recipes of the three brothers Butcher, Baker, Candlestick Maker

== Season 2 ==
=== The Inferno Run ===
The Inferno Run replaced the Labyrinth in Season 2, and like with the Labyrinth, any contestant that accomplishes their individual challenge will get to participate in the Inferno Run. In the Inferno Run, there are seven doors with each door corresponding to one of the Seven Deadly Sins. One of those doors is removed for each of the individual challenges completed (always the sins relating to the challenge(s) completed by each successful contestant). The contestant(s) have a total of seven minutes to complete the remaining challenges (the time runs continuously once the round starts). Accomplishing each challenge will either reward them with money or with the key to free their teammate(s).

If two or more contestant(s) make it to the Inferno Run, they will attempt the challenges individually. Once they enter the door, the Soska Sisters will explain the rules of the challenge. The contestant(s) must continue completing challenges, alternating turns, until they find the key. If they do find the key they may choose to either attempt additional challenges (if any remain) for extra money, or free their teammates and head back to the Hellevator. If the contestant(s) choose to play another challenge, they must complete it before they again have the option to end the game, if they choose to free their teammates, they cannot attempt any more challenges and must then return to the Hellevator. The entire team must return to the Hellevator before time runs out in order to keep their winnings from the Inferno Run, if they fail to do so, they forfeit the money from the Inferno Run, although they will retain any winnings from the individual challenges. Any episode ending in an Inferno Run failure ends with all of the contestants trapped in separate rooms in the Slaughterhouse, presumably "tortured" to death.

There is a total of $40,000 in cash available, so that a team that plays a perfect game will again win a total of $50,000.

=== The Seven Deadly Sins ===
- Envy - The contestant must make both sides of the childhood bedroom (which the Soska Sisters claim to be theirs) match by taking a number of duplicate items from Sylvia's purple side and move them to Jen's grey side.
- Gluttony - The contestant must search the birthday cakes using only their mouth to find the cash inside.
- Greed - The contestant must search the safety deposit boxes for the combination to open the bank safe.
- Lust - The contestant must retrieve a wedding ring from one of the holes in the wall and place it on the finger of the lusty corpse bride.
- Pride - The contestant must siphon 15 pounds of fat or more from the patient in the operating room.
- Sloth - The contestant must fix the gaps in the two leaking pipes by attaching the connectors that fit.
- Wrath - The contestant must find the colored needles and jab them into the matching colored X's on the life-size voodoo doll.

=== Episodes ===
| No. overall | No. in season | Title | Original release date |
|---|---|---|---|
| 9 | 1 | "Gluttons for Punishment" | October 7, 2016 |
| 10 | 2 | "Rest in Pieces" | October 14, 2016 |
| 11 | 3 | "Drop Dead Gorgeous" | October 21, 2016 |
| 12 | 4 | "Blood, Sweat & Cheer" | October 28, 2016 |
