= Cecily Polson =

Australian actress

- Born: New Zealand
- Occupation: Actress
- Years active: 1969–2011
- Known for: E Street (TV series) as Martha O'Dare
- Spouse: Peter Gwynne

Cecily Polson is an Australian former actress, best known for her role as Martha O'Dare in the television series E Street, in which she appeared for its four-year run from the pilot in 1989 to 1993, appearing in 403 episodes.

She has primarily appeared in television soap opera as a character actress including Certain Women, Cop Shop, Ryan, Homicide (5 roles), Division 4 (8 roles), A Country Practice (3 roles), G.P., The Flying Doctors and All Saints (5 roles).

Her film roles dating from 1969 onwards include both theatrical and TV movies The Year of Living Dangerously and Muriel's Wedding. She also appeared in the horror genre films See No Evil and See No Evil 2.

She was married to fellow New Zealand-born Australian actor Peter Gwynne.

== Filmography ==
=== Film ===
Year	Title	Role	Type
1974	The Dove	Mrs. Castaldi	Feature film US/Australia
1982	The Year of Living Dangerously	Moira	Feature film
1994	Muriel's Wedding	Tania's Mother	Feature film
1999	Kick	Mrs. Derrick	Feature film
2006	See No Evil	Margaret	Feature film
2010-11	The Clinic	Woman on Perch	Feature film
2014	See No Evil 2	Margaret	Feature film

=== Television ===
Year	Title	Role	Type
1969	Green Gin Sunset	Joyce	TV movie
1970–75	Division 4	Guest roles: Anna Doherty / June Boyd / Jean Marshall / Rhoda O'Brien / Patty Cooper / Janet / Hiliary Martin / Gail De Costa	TV series, 8 episodes: "Gaolbird", "So, It's a Living", "The I.O.U.", "Last of the Independents", "You Think You've Got Trouble", "Three Mouths to Feed", "You Never Forget the First Time", "Rubber Bunny"
1970	Dynasty	Guest role: Jenkins	TV series, 1 episode
1971	The Comedy Game	Guest role: Wilkins	TV anthology series, 1 episode
1971–73	Catwalk	Regular role: Miss Jenkins	TV series, 14 episodes
1972–76	Matlock Police	Guest roles: Gwen Hart / Mandy / Sue Thomas / Judy Smith / Liz McDonald	TV series, 5 episodes: "Hogans Week", "Blow Ups Happen", "What's in It for Me?", "Crow Meat", "Johnny Come Home'"
1973	Catch Kandy	Guest role: Mrs. James	TV series, 1 episode
1973	Tournai Elephant Boy	Guest role: Erika Madison	TV series, 1 episode
1973–76	Homicide	Guest roles: Psychiatrist / Film Truck Hijacker / Carol Adams / Sister Augusta / Sen. Det. Helen Murray	TV series, 5 episodes: "Matchmaker", "The Crossing", "Running Nowhere", "Spools and Clocks", "Party Games"
1973; 1974	Ryan	Guest roles: Gail Scott / Vicki	TV series, 2 episodes
1974	The End Product	Querrel	TV movie
1974–75	Certain Women	Recurring role	TV series, 8 episodes
1975	Quality of Mercy	Guest role	TV series, 1 episode: "Twice Blessed"
1975	Shannon's Mob	Guest role: Edith Thomas	TV series, 1 episode: "Mixed Doubles"
1976	Do I Have to Kill My Child?	Susan	TV movie
1976	Moynihan		TV series, episode: "Over to You"
1978	Cop Shop	Guest role: Barbara York	TV series, 1 episode
1979	Skyways	Recurring guest role: Jocelyn Powell	TV series, 3 episodes
1981	A Town Like Alice	Recurring role: Eileen Holland	TV miniseries, 1 episode
1981	A Sporting Chance	Guest role	TV series, 1 episode: "Nobody Loves a Loser"
1983–87	A Country Practice	Guest roles: Rita Murray / Karen Robson / Jennifer Power	TV series, 6 episodes, including: "Hair of the Dog", "Castle in the Air", "The Last Straw"
1985	Double Sculls	Nursing Sister	TV movie
1986	BabaKiueria	Mother	TV movie
1987	Future Past	Dymphna	TV movie
1987–88	The Flying Doctors	Recurring role: Eileen Patterson	TV series, 3 episodes
1988	Swap Shop	Regular role	TV series
1989–93	E Street	Regular role: Martha O'Dare	TV series, 403 episodes
1994	G.P.	Guest role: Fran Harwood	TV series, 1 episode
1995	Correlli	Guest role: Jean	TV series, 1 episode: "Roman Holiday"
1999–2007	All Saints	Guest roles: Monica Dowd / Meredith Renshaw / June Burns	TV series, 4 episodes: "If These Walls Could Talk", "Shame", "Nowhere to Hide", "Reality Check"
2004	The Alice	May	TV pilot
2005	Blue Water High	Guest role: Heath's Grandmother	TV series, 1 episode: "Tough Choices"
