= Vendetta (2015 film) =

2015 vigilante action film by the Soska sisters

- Theatrical release poster
- Directed by: Jen and Sylvia Soska
- Written by: Justin Shady
- Produced by: Michael J. Luisi
- Starring: Dean Cain; The Big Show; Michael Eklund
- Cinematography: Mahlon Todd Williams
- Edited by: Richard Nord
- Music by: The Newton Brothers
- Production company: WWE Studios
- Distributed by: Lionsgate Films
- Release date: June 12, 2015
- Running time: 90 minutes.
- Country: United States
- Language: English

Vendetta is a 2015 American vigilante action film directed by the Soska sisters starring Dean Cain, The Big Show, and Michael Eklund. It is the first film in the "Action Six-Pack" series. The film was released in a limited release and through video on demand on June 12, 2015.

== Plot ==
When his pregnant wife is violently killed by a criminal whom he put away, Mason, a hard-nosed detective, deliberately gets arrested to get revenge. While inside, Mason discovers a new criminal enterprise that those behind it would kill to protect.

== Cast ==
- Dean Cain as Mason Danvers
- The Big Show as Victor Abbot
- Michael Eklund as Warden Snyder
- Kyra Zagorsky as Jocelyn Danvers
- Ben Hollingsworth as Joel Gainer
- Aleks Paunovic as Griffin
- Adrian Holmes as Drexel
- Jonathan Walker as Lester
- Juan Riedinger as Booker
- Uros Certic as Marco
- Matthew MacCaull as Ben
- Paul Anthony as "Daddy Mak"

== Production ==
Vendetta was filmed in Coquitlam, British Columbia, Canada.

Vendetta was part of a six-film deal WWE Studios made with Lionsgate that will be releasing WWE's Action Six-Pack, a series of unconnected action films.

== Release ==
Vendetta received a limited theatrical release. It was released to theaters and video on demand on June 12, 2015.

== Reception ==
The Hollywood Reporter described the film as "the sort of B-movie violent actioner that makes you feel your testosterone level rising as you watch it", while the "screenplay offers no surprises, mainly serving as a springboard for the endless series of fight scenes in which Cain demonstrates that he's become a serious movie badass." The Soska sisters "prove themselves quite proficient at staging the brutal skirmishes which inevitably lead to a climatic prison riot."
