= Rabid (1977 film) =

1977 body horror film by David Cronenberg

- Theatrical release poster
- Directed by: David Cronenberg
- Written by: David Cronenberg
- Produced by: John Dunning
- Starring: Marilyn Chambers; Frank Moore; Joe Silver; Howard Ryshpan
- Cinematography: René Verzier
- Edited by: Jean LaFleur
- Production companies: Cinema Entertainment Enterprises; DAL Productions; The Dibar Syndicate; Famous Players
- Distributed by: Cinépix (Canada); New World Pictures (United States)
- Release dates: April 8, 1977 (Canada); July 6, 1977 (United States)
- Running time: 91 minutes
- Country: Canada
- Language: English
- Budget: CA$530,000–$550,000
- Box office: CA$7 million

Rabid is a 1977 Canadian body horror film written and directed by David Cronenberg, and starring Marilyn Chambers, Frank Moore, Joe Silver, and Howard Ryshpan. The film follows Rose Miller, a woman who, after being injured in a motorcycle accident and undergoing a surgical operation, develops an orifice under one of her arms that hides a phallic/clitoral stinger she uses to feed on human blood, spreading a disease from the Quebec countryside into urban Montreal.

A co-production between Canada and the United States, Rabid was filmed on location in Montreal in the late fall of 1976. Released in Canada in the spring of 1977, the film was a major box-office success, particularly in the United States; the film grossed over $7 million internationally.

Rabid has developed a cult following in the years since its release, and been noted by film critics and scholars for its political themes of societal dissolution in the wake of martial law, echoing the October Crisis of 1970 in Montreal. A remake of the same name, directed by Jen and Sylvia Soska, was released in 2019.

== Plot ==
Rose Miller and her boyfriend, Hart Reed, are involved in a motorcycle accident in the Quebec countryside after encountering a van in the middle of the road. Hart suffers a broken hand, a separated shoulder and a concussion, while Rose is severely injured and burned. They are taken to the Keloid Clinic for Plastic Surgery, where Dr. Dan Keloid performs an experimental procedure on Rose, using morphogenetically neutral grafts to replace her damaged skin and organs. Hart is released after a month, but Rose remains in a coma.

Rose suddenly awakens one night screaming and pierces fellow patient Lloyd Walsh's skin. The doctors are puzzled as Lloyd has no memory of the incident and his blood fails to clot. Unknown to them, Rose's procedure has caused her to mutate, allowing her to survive only on human blood. A red stinger-like organ emerges under her armpit, which she uses to feed on her victims. One night, Rose leaves the clinic and attempts to feed on a cow but becomes sick. A farmer attacks her, but she retaliates by feeding on him and then calls Hart to pick her up. The next day, the farmer transforms into a zombie-like creature and attacks a waitress at a roadside diner. Meanwhile, Lloyd leaves the clinic but, during a taxi ride, begins foaming at the mouth and attacks the driver, resulting in a fatal crash.

At the clinic, Dr. Keloid becomes infected by Rose's stinger, causing chaos as he attacks a nurse during an operation. Rose escapes and hitchhikes to Montreal, where she infects a truck driver. Hart, along with Dr. Keloid's business partner Murray Cypher, teams up with police chief Claude LePointe and public health officials to discuss the escalating epidemic. Hart witnesses an infected police officer before the officer is shot. He calls Rose's friend, Mindy, and asks her to keep Rose at her apartment if she shows up. Rose arrives in Montreal and stays with Mindy. While Mindy watches a news broadcast about a rabies-like epidemic spreading in the city, Rose goes to an adult movie theater and infects a patron. Later, Mindy encounters an infected woman attacking passengers on the subway. Meanwhile, LePointe and his team are attacked by infected workmen. With the outbreak worsening and rabies treatments failing, Dr. Royce Gentry advises a shoot-to-kill policy to prevent further infections. Martial law is declared and the Canadian Army sets up roadblocks, while NBC-suited soldiers help dispose of bodies. Rose attempts to seduce a male victim among a crowd of Christmas shoppers in a mall, but is interrupted when an infected man attacks, spurring a violent shootout by armed forces.

Murray and Hart arrive at Murray's home, where Murray finds his baby dead and is attacked by his infected wife. Hart drives into the abandoned city to search for Rose. An infected person jumps onto his car but is shot by soldiers, who disinfect Hart's vehicle before allowing him to continue. Mindy watches a news report indicating the infection may have originated at the Keloid Clinic. Rose returns to Mindy's apartment and feeds on her. Hart finds Rose in the act and pleads with her to seek treatment, but she denies responsibility for the epidemic. Rose infects a man in the apartment lobby and locks herself in a room with him, planning to test whether he becomes infected. As Hart desperately tries to convince her to leave, the man turns rabid and attacks Rose. The next morning, Rose's body is found in an alley by NBC-suited soldiers, who dispose of her corpse in a garbage truck.

== Cast ==
- Marilyn Chambers as Rose Miller
- Frank Moore as Hart Read
- Joe Silver as Murray Cypher
- Howard Ryshpan as Dan Keloid
- Patricia Gage as Roxanne Keloid
- Susan Roman as Mindy Kent
- J. Roger Periard as Lloyd Walsh
- Lynne Deragon as Nurse Louise
- Terry Schonblum as Judy Glasberg
- Victor Désy as Claude LaPointe
- Julie Anna as Nurse Rita
- Gary McKeehan as Smooth Eddy
- Terence G. Ross as the Farmer
- Allan Moyle as the young man in the lobby
- John Boylan as the young cop in the plaza
- Vlasta Vrana as the cop at the clinic
- Peter MacNeill as the loader
- Louis Negin as Maxim

== Themes ==
Rabid has been noted by several journalists and critics for its political themes, particularly the breakdown of societal institutions, paralleling the October Crisis of 1970 in which Prime Minister Pierre Trudeau controversially activated the War Measures Act in several Canadian cities, including Montreal. Journalist Linda Gross of the Los Angeles Times noted in her 1977 review of the film that Rabid contains "ominous political overtones, effectively showing how martial law and police tyranny can become another kind of epidemic." The Canadian Film Encyclopedia echoes this sentiment, describing the film as a "subversive commentary on the October Crisis of 1970; the film was shot in Montreal and features a world so crippled by fear that martial law has been imposed."

== Production ==
=== Development ===
Cinépix requested another film from David Cronenberg following the success of Shivers. Criticism from Robert Fulford about the Canadian Film Development Corporation's funding of Shivers made it more difficult for Cronenberg to gain funding for his films. The CFDC funded the film through cross-collateralization with Convoy, which was never completed, to avoid a direct connection.

Initially titled Mosquitoes Cronenberg had difficulty writing the script due to the broader nature of the film's city setting compared to Shivers which took place in one apartment complex. At one point he told John Dunning that "John, I just woke up this morning and realized this is nuts. Do you know what this movie's about? This woman grows a cock thing in her armpit and sucks people's blood through it. It's ridiculous! I can't do this. It's not going to work."

=== Casting ===
Cronenberg wanted Sissy Spacek to play the lead character after seeing her performance in Badlands. However, Dunning rejected her citing her freckles and her Texan accent. Marilyn Chambers was suggested by executive producer Ivan Reitman. Reitman heard that Chambers was looking for a mainstream role and had existing name recognition. Cronenberg agreed to cast Chambers after being impressed by her audition, even though he had not seen her best-known movie, Behind the Green Door. Cronenberg would later say that he had been impressed by Chambers and her work ethic during the filming of Rabid. Spacek would star in the hit film Carrie; Cronenberg included a poster for that movie in the background of a scene in Rabid.

=== Filming ===
Principal photography of Rabid took place in Montreal from November 1 to December 5, 1976, on a budget of approximately $530,000 (equivalent to $2,798,264 in 2025)–$550,000 (equivalent to $2,903,859 in 2025), with $200,000 coming from the CFDC. According to Cronenberg, at the time, the only CFDC films that had turned a profit were the two that he had made for the corporation, Shivers and Crimes of the Future. Cronenberg's editing decisions to tighten and reduce the film's runtime produced criticism such as his removal of a scene, which he regretted cutting, explaining the development of the armpit orifice.

Some filming occurred at Cavendish Mall, as well as Notre-Dame Hospital.

== Release ==
The film was distributed by Cinépix in Canada and released on April 8, 1977, in Montreal. It was released theatrically in the United States by New World Pictures on July 6, 1977. Rabid and Shivers were re-released as a double feature in Paris in December 1994.

=== Home media ===
Warner Home Video released Rabid on VHS in 1983. In 2000, it was released on DVD by New Concorde Home Entertainment. E1 Entertainment released a special edition DVD in 2004.

The film was re-released on DVD and Blu-ray for Region B by Arrow Video on February 16, 2015. Scream Factory released the film on Blu-ray on November 22, 2016. On December 16, 2025, Scream Factory reissued the film in 4K UHD and Blu-ray formats.

== Reception ==
=== Box office ===
Rabid grossed CA$100,000 in the first ten days after opening in Montreal. The film was one of the highest-grossing Canadian films of all time, earning approximately $7 million at the box office, including over $900,000 in its native Canada.

=== Critical response ===
Variety called Rabid "an extremely violent, sometimes nauseating, picture". Les Wedman of the Vancouver Sun described the movie's story as "dreadful" and criticized the film for "relying heavily on shocking special effects" as opposed to suspense. He opined that, with the exception of Joe Silver, "there isn't a decent performance in the movie." Martin Malina, who reviewed the film alongside similar films Demon Seed and Audrey Rose in the same column of the Montreal Star, said that it "has some genuinely frightening moments but they are few, and the story progresses in fits and starts. The dialogue is witless, the exposition awkward, and the film spends far too much time travelling in cars between one gory scene and another.". Clyde Gilmour of The Toronto Star noted of the film's box office success, but stated that he was "not sure what this proves, except possibly that Canadians, when they really try, can make nauseating movies as efficiently as Americans."

Conversely, Time Out called the film "far better staged" than Shivers, and concluded, "None of the other recent apocalypse movies has shown so much political or cinematic sophistication." Linda Gross of the Los Angeles Times described the film as a "scary and crude variation of the traditional vampire story" and praised Cronenberg's direction and the film's "grueling tension," though she found the film's storytelling inconsistent; she did, however, commend the performances, particularly Chambers', describing it as conveying "just the proper combination of vulnerability and deadliness."

Bruce McCabe of The Boston Globe found the film obscene, deeming it "a depraved film that no adult with any kind of sensitivity should be caught dead at."

=== Accolades ===
Institution	Year	Category	Recipient	Result	Ref.
Sitges Film Festival	1977	Best Screenplay	David Cronenberg	Won	
Sitges Film Festival	1977	Best Special Effects	Al Griswold	Won	

=== Modern assessment ===
On the review aggregator website Rotten Tomatoes, 78% of 27 critics' reviews are positive. The website's consensus reads: "Its gruesome scares may nauseate more than thrill, but Rabid bites into its story with distinct sophistication and thought-provoking themes." Metacritic, which uses a weighted average, assigned the film a score of 56 out of 100, based on 9 critics, indicating "mixed or average" reviews.

Critic Glenn Erickson, reviewing the film in 2016, praised it, writing: "Rabid remains a highly entertaining horror show that hasn’t lost an iota of shock value. It certainly lined up the fans—and investors—to allow the director to continue his personal exploration of queasy, outrageous biological delights."

== Remake ==
A remake of the film, directed by Jen and Sylvia Soska and starring Laura Vandervoort as Rose, was released on December 13, 2019.

== Related works ==
A novelization by Richard Lewis was published in 1978. Faber & Faber released the screenplay in 2002 in a collection of the scripts for Cronenberg's first four feature films.

== Sources ==
- Leeder, Murray; Loiselle, André (2024). "Canadian Vampires". In Bacon, Simon (ed.). The Palgrave Handbook of the Vampire. Cham, Switzerland: Palgrave Macmillan. pp. 811–826. ISBN 978-3-031-36253-8.
- Cronenberg, David (2006). David Cronenberg: Interviews with Serge Grünberg. London, England: Plexus Publishing. ISBN 978-0-859-65376-3.
- Mathijs, Ernest (2008). The Cinema of David Cronenberg: From Baron of Blood to Cultural Hero. New York City, New York: Wallflower Press. ISBN 978-1-905-67465-7.
- Morris, Peter (1994). David Cronenberg: A Delicate Balance. Toronto, Ontario: ECW Press. ISBN 978-1-550-22191-6.
- Rodley, Chris, ed. (1997). Cronenberg on Cronenberg. London, England: Faber & Faber. ISBN 978-0-571-19137-6.
- Turner, D. John, ed. (1987). Canadian Feature Film Index: 1913-1985. Ottawa, Ontario: Canadian Film Institute. ISBN 978-0-660-53364-3.
- Vatnsdal, Caelum (2004). They Came From Within : A History of Canadian Horror Cinema. Winnipeg, Manitobia: Arbeiter Ring Publishing. ISBN 978-1-894-03721-1.
