= Eric July =

American musician, YouTuber, comic book writer and libertarian political commentator

- Born: Eric Dewayne July; April 17, 1990 (age 36); Dallas, Texas, U.S.
- Other name: Young Rippa
- Education: University of Memphis; Texas A&M University–Corpus Christi
- Occupations: Musician; writer; YouTube personality; singer; rapper
- Notable work: Isom
- Musical career
- Member of: BackWordz
- Formerly of: Fire from the Gods

Eric Dewayne July (born April 17, 1990) is an American musician, YouTuber, comic book writer, and libertarian political commentator. He is the founder, chief executive officer, and lead writer of Rippaverse Comics, an independent comic book publishing company established in 2022. The company was launched with the objective of promoting creative independence and decentralization within the entertainment industry. July has advocated for Rippaverse as an alternative to mainstream publishers, emphasizing creator ownership and consumer-driven storytelling

In addition to his work in publishing, July is the lead vocalist for the rap metal band BackWordz, whose music is characterized by heavy instrumentals and lyrics that reflect libertarian themes, including individual freedom and limited government. He is also a contributor to Blaze Media and a YouTube commentator, where he discusses topics such as cultural trends, economic issues, and media criticism, often from a libertarian perspective. Earlier in his career, July was the frontman for the band Fire from the Gods before transitioning to his current pursuits in entrepreneurship, music, and media.

== Early life ==
Eric July was born in Dallas, Texas, and grew up in Oak Cliff. His parents separated when he was a young child, and he lost contact with his father. After getting involved in gang activity as a teen, he was sent to Arkansas to live with his grandmother. Later he moved back to Dallas, where he was kicked out of multiple high schools despite being a talented track athlete until he was shot in the knee. A narrow escape from a drive-by shooting and the death of a close friend caused July to reconsider his lifestyle. He attended the University of Memphis on a track and field scholarship. Later, he went to Texas A&M University–Corpus Christi, where he majored in communications. July says he changed his political views from far left to libertarian at this time when reading black economists such as Thomas Sowell and Walter Williams. He moved back to Dallas in March 2015.

== Music career ==
July first performed under the name YG Ripple in Corpus Christi, and became involved in the hardcore metal scene there and in San Antonio. He played keyboards early on, then switched to vocals in the band Fire from the Gods. He formed the band BackWordz in which he also performs vocals, in late 2014. In 2016, the band signed to the record label Stay Sick Recordings, run by Chris Fronzak, vocalist for the metalcore band Attila. BackWordz billed themselves as the libertarian Rage Against the Machine. In 2025, July performed alongside metal singer Dan Vasc on the song "Glorious Death" as a promotion for the Rippaverse comic book "Norfrica: Glorious Death #1", about a metal band who fights demons while touring.

== Comic book career ==
In July 2022, Eric July debuted his new publishing company Rippaverse Comics, with an online marketing campaign selling comic books and merchandise for the company's first project, Isom. The campaign exceeded its original $100,000 goal, raising $1.7 million by July 15, $2.5 million by July 18, and $3 million by July 22. In May 2023, Rippaverse Comics announced upcoming installments to the universe, including Isom #2, Alphacore by Chuck Dixon, and Yaira by Jen and Sylvia Soska. The third comic book campaign of the Rippaverse, Goodyng written by Mike Baron, earned around $291,000. In 2025, July worked on an anthology comic book for Rippaverse Comics called "Saint & Sinners #1" alongside YouTubers Jay David (aka Drunk 3po), HeelvsBabyface, Will Jordan (aka The Critical Drinker), Callum Edmunds (aka Mauler), and directors Jen and Sylvia Soska. This first anthology book for Rippaverse Comics made over $515,255 for the preorder campaign on the Rippaverse site.

July was awarded the Richard DeVos Young Entrepreneur Award from Northwood University as part of its 2024 Class of Outstanding Business Leaders. He launched his Rippasend service, in which other comic book creators could leverage his comic fulfillment business, in early 2024. Beginning July 2026, Rippaverse uses Hachette Book Group as its sales and distribution partner for both retail and wholesale.

== Political activities ==
July campaigned for Barack Obama in 2008. He now describes himself as an anarcho-capitalist who tries "to get people thinking more critically about things.", He helped found a group called Minorities Seeking Solutions, which he says aims to connect with young black males in particular and help empower them. He is a contributor for the Blaze TV network.

== Personal life ==
July married his wife, Tori, a.k.a. Lady Rippa, in 2021. In September 2025, he announced the birth of their first child.
