= Miracle on the Mountain: The Kincaid Family Story =

- Genre: Drama
- Written by: Dan Levine
- Directed by: Michael Switzer
- Starring: Patty Duke; William Devane; Natasha Melnick; Kaj-Erik Eriksen; Elisabeth Rosen
- Music by: David Mansfield
- Country of origin: United States
- Original language: English

Production
- Executive producers: John Morrissey; Lawrence Turman
- Producer: Preston Fischer
- Cinematography: Thomas Burstyn
- Editor: Charles Bornstein
- Running time: 90 minutes
- Production companies: Columbia TriStar Television; The Turman-Morrissey Company

Original release
- Network: CBS
- Release: April 26, 2000

Miracle on the Mountain: The Kincaid Family Story is a 2000 American drama television film directed by Michael Switzer, written by Dan Levine, and starring Patty Duke, William Devane. Natasha Melnick, Kaj-Erik Eriksen and Elisabeth Rosen. It aired on CBS on April 26, 2000.

== Plot ==
Synopsis

A problematic and wealthy family travels to the mountains for a family celebration, but their private plane develops some troubles and crashes on an isolated and cold mountain. Now, the family must work together to survive the extreme wilderness conditions, including an avalanche.

Story

A plane crashes into the forests during the winter and only the Kincaid family survives. They then travel through the forest in search of rescue. The father collapses in the middle of searching and they find a cabin that is unfortunately broken. Meanwhile, a search and rescue team lands in the area and sets off to find the family.

The family uses the cabin to their advantage and uses the broken pieces to start fires while the father, who may be suffering from Frostbite, stays inside the cabin weak. They later decide to not leave the cabin and use their supposed only flare to start a fire. On the next day, the family digs a hole for the father to sleep in after scavenging the cabin’s resources.

The search and rescue team begins to get ready to leave after concluding that the family died in the crash before an relative of the family finds a drawing on a tree and urges the team to find the family. The family, now all living in a hole, notices at dawn a sound. The brother looks out to see two men riding a snow motorcycle. Despite the father not waking up, the brother sets off to chase the men with a skateboard. The skateboard breaks mid-run so he continues the chase on foot. After climbing a hill, he sees the two men, throws a flare that he has been keeping, and blacks out.

The two men find the brother and the rest of the family and take them back to the search and rescue base where they reunite with their relative and get back home.

== Cast ==
- Patty Duke as Anne Kincaid
- William Devane as Tom Kincaid
- Natasha Melnick as Susan Kincaid
- Kaj-Erik Eriksen as Rick Kincaid
- Elisabeth Rosen as Carla Kincaid
- Armando Valdes-Kennedy as Charlie Sanchez
- Kevin McNulty as Dave
- Ingrid Torrance as Alexis
- William Sanderson as Helicopter Pilot
- Kene Holliday as Jack Calloway

== Reception ==
Laura Fries from Variety gave the film a negative review, stating: "Keep moving, folks. Nothing new to see here unless you haven’t gotten your fill of the jeopardy of the week. In fact, this latest family drama isn’t even based on a true story. Heck, it’s not even inspired by a real incident. "Miracle on the Mountain" is touted by CBS as a movie "suggested by actual events." At this point, you might as well just admit it's fiction, and not particularly good fiction at that.". David Parkinson from Radio Times gave the film two out of five stars, concluding: "Director Michael Switzer makes the most of the scenery and stages an impressive avalanche, but the domestic duelling rapidly becomes wearisome."
