= Fire from the Gods =

American rap metal band

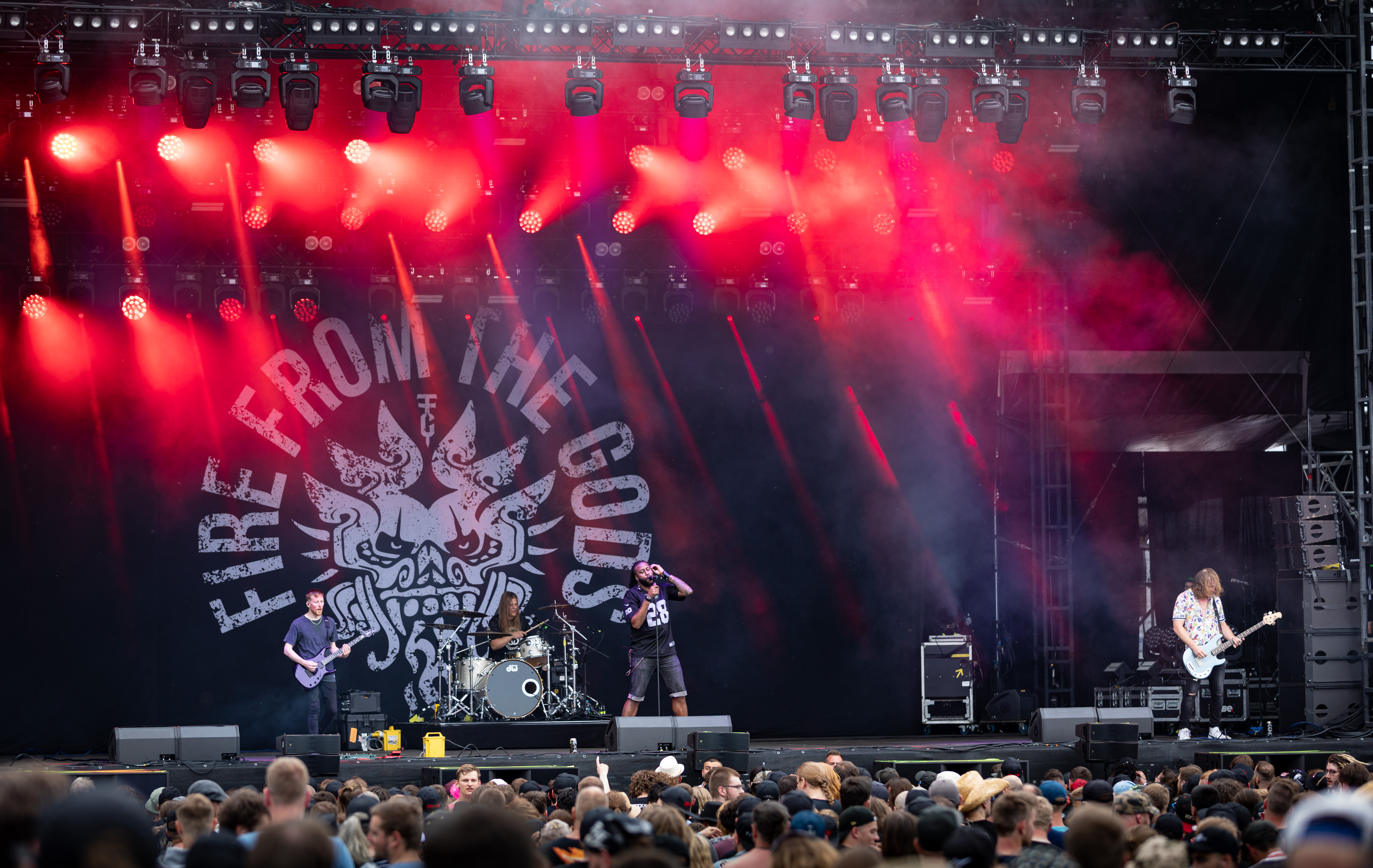
- Fire from the Gods live at Rock am Ring 2022

Background information
- Origin: Austin, Texas, U.S.
- Genres: Rap metal; hard rock; metalcore
- Years active: 2007–present
- Labels: Rise; Eleven Seven; Better Noise
- Members: Drew Walker; Bonner Baker; Jameson Teat; Richard Wicander; Myke Terry
- Past members: Michael Vincent; Eric July; Chris Mardis; Tony Esparza; Chad Huff; Judson Curtis; AJ Channer; Jebediah Roper
- Website: www.firefromthegods.com

Fire from the Gods (often abbreviated as FFTG) is an American rap metal band formed in Austin, Texas in 2007. The band is currently signed to Better Noise and consists of lead guitarist Drew Walker, bassist Bonner Baker, rhythm guitarist and backing vocalist Jameson Teat, drummer Richard Wicander and lead vocalist Myke Terry.

FFTG has released three full-length albums to date: Narrative (2016, Rise), American Sun (2019, Eleven Seven), Soul Revolution (2022, Better Noise).

== History ==
=== Formation, early years and lineup changes (2007–2015) ===
Fire from the Gods was formed in Austin, Texas in 2007 by guitarists Drew Walker and Tony Esparza, bassist Bonner Baker, keyboardist Jebediah Roper, drummer Chad Huff, and vocalist Michael Vincent, who came together following a local battle of the bands. Their original vocalist was Michael Vincent, who still has the recordings of their EP "Sweet Lasting Revenge" on his personal YouTube account, which also appears to have previously been the official band page. Their musical genre and influences were described as "blending hip-hop, metal and hardcore".

In 2011, Judson Curtis replaced Chad Huff on drums in time for the Sweet Lasting Revenge EP and Michael Vincent would be replaced on vocals by Eric July for Politically Incorrect EP (2013). At the end of 2013, Jameson Teat and Richard Wicander replaced Tony Esparza and Judson Curtis on rhythm guitar and drums respectively. Chris Mardis was originally hired as a fill-in vocalist after departure of Eric July at this same time, but then stayed onboard when the band officially added A.J. Channer in 2014.

=== Narrative and Narrative Retold (2015–2019) ===
On October 12, 2015, Fire from the Gods released "Pretenders", their first single under Rise Records. The single version of the song included both Channer and Mardis on vocals. Following the departure of Mardis in 2016 as FFTG were recording Narrative, Channer became the sole vocalist.

Narrative, the band's debut full-length album, was produced by David Bendeth and released on August 26, 2016, via Rise. The album contained the hit singles "Excuse Me" and "End Transmission", and tackled controversial subjects such as racism and abuse of power.

In 2017 the album was re-released as Narrative Retold with the addition of two new songs, "The Voiceless" and "The Taste", both of which were produced by Korn's Jonathan Davis. Following the release of Narrative Retold, the band went on tour with Born of Osiris, Volumes, Within the Ruins, Oceans Ate Alaska, and later with P.O.D., Alien Ant Farm and Powerflo.

In 2018, Fire from the Gods supported such acts as Sevendust, Of Mice & Men, Memphis May Fire and In Flames on selected dates of their respective US headlining tours.

=== American Sun and American Sun: Reimagined (2019–2021) ===
In 2019, the band signed with Five Finger Death Punch guitarist's Zoltan Bathory record label Eleven Seven, and released their second album American Sun on November 1, 2019, produced by Erik Ron. The album was preceded by singles "Truth To the Weak (Not Built To Collapse)" (released on July 26, 2019), "Right Now" (August 30, 2019) and "Make You Feel It" (October 4, 2019). It also contains song "They Don't Like It" featuring Sonny Sandoval of P.O.D. American Sun, like Narrative, deals with issues such as political unrest, technological overload, political discord, and environmental apathy.

In July 2019, Fire from the Gods toured supporting Five Finger Death Punch alongside In This Moment. Coinciding with the release of American Sun, the band supported Five Finger Death Punch, alongside Bad Wolves and Three Days Grace, on a tour that started with back-to-back shows at the Joint at the Hard Rock Hotel on November 1 and 2, 2019.

On June 18, 2021, the band released a four-track American Sun: Reimagined EP.

On August 27, 2021, a song "Victory (feat. Matt B. of From Ashes to New)" was released as the last single supporting American Sun.

=== Soul Revolution (2021–present) ===
In December, 2021, AJ Channer announced on the Lonestar Collective podcast that the band would be going into the studio in January, 2022 to begin recording their third album.

In March-April of 2022, FFTG toured US supporting From Ashes to New on their Still Panicking Tour alongside Blind Channel, Kingdom Collapse and Above Snakes. From August to October, 2022, the band toured as a supporting act for Five Finger Death Punch on their headlining US tour alongside Megadeth and The HU.

The band's third album, Soul Revolution, co-produced by Erik Ron and Richard Wicander, was released on October 28, 2022, via Better Noise Music to positive reviews. It was preceded by singles "SOS" (released on June 3, 2022), "Soul Revolution" (July 15, 2022), "Thousand Lifetimes" (August 26, 2022) and "World So Cold" (September 30, 2022).

In February-March 2023, FFTG toured as a supporting act for Norma Jean's US The Deathrattle Tour alongside Greyhaven.

"Thousand Lifetimes" was re-recorded featuring Corey Glover of Living Colour and re-released as a single on February 17, 2023.

In 2025, vocalist Myke Terry, of Volumes, replaced Channer as frontman.

== Band members ==
=== Current ===
- Drew Walker – lead guitar (2007–present)
- Bonner Baker – bass (2007–present)
- Jameson Teat – rhythm guitar, backing vocals (2013–present)
- Richard Wicander – drums (2013–present)
- Myke Terry – lead vocals, guitar (2025–present)

=== Former ===
- Jebediah Roper – keyboards (2007–2009)
- Chad Huff – drums (2007–2011)
- Michael Vincent – lead vocals (2007–2012)
- Eric July – lead vocals (2012–2013)
- Tony Esparza – rhythm guitar (2007–2013)
- Judson Curtis – drums (2011–2013)
- Chris Mardis – lead vocals, keyboards (2013–2016)
- AJ Channer – lead vocals (2014–2025)

== Discography ==
=== Studio albums ===
Title	Details	Peak chart positions				
Title	Details	US Dig.	US Hard	US Heat.	US Indie.	US Sale.
Narrative	Released: July 6, 2016; Label: Rise	—	16	17	46	—
American Sun	Released: November 1, 2019; Label: Eleven Seven	22	—	6	20	79
Soul Revolution	Released: October 28, 2022; Label: Better Noise	—	—	—	—	—

=== EPs ===
- Sleeping with Anchors and Mirrors (2010)
- Sweet Lasting Revenge (2011)
- Politically Incorrect (2013)
- American Sun: Reimagined (2021)
- Soul Revolution: Acoustic Vibes (2023)

=== Singles ===
Year	Song	Peak chart positions			Album
Year	Song	US Air.	US Main.	US Rock	Album
2013	"Smoke Screen"	—	—	—	Politically Incorrect
2015	"EAT"	—	—	—	non-album single
2015	"Pretenders"	—	—	—	Narrative
2016	"Excuse Me"	—	—	—	Narrative
2016	"End Transmission"	—	—	—	Narrative
2017	"The Voiceless"	—	—	—	Narrative Retold
2017	"The Taste"	—	—	—	Narrative Retold
2019	"Truth to the Weak (Not Built to Collapse)"	—	—	—	American Sun
2019	"Right Now"	26	6	48	American Sun
2020	"American Sun"	—	—	—	American Sun
2021	"Victory" (featuring Matt Brandyberry)	—	—	—	American Sun
2022	"SOS"	—	—	—	Soul Revolution
2022	"Soul Revolution"	—	—	—	Soul Revolution
2022	"Thousand Lifetimes"	—	—	—	Soul Revolution
2022	"World So Cold"	—	—	—	Soul Revolution
2023	"Thousand Lifetimes" (feat. Corey Glover of Living Colour)	—	—	—	Soul Revolution
2025	"Incinerate"	—	—	—	
2026	"Human"	—	—	—	

=== Guest appearances ===
- Ill Niño
  - "Máscara" (feat. AJ Channer from Fire from the Gods) (Single, 2020)
- Islander
  - It's Not Easy Being Human (2020)
    - "Freedom" (feat. AJ Channer of Fire from the Gods)
- Kerosene Shores
  - "Glimpse In Your Mirror" (feat. AJ Channer of Fire from the Gods) (Single, 2020)
- Dear Desolate
  - "Voyager" feat. AJ Channer of Fire from the Gods (Single, 2021)
- Tallah
  - The Generation of Danger (2022)
    - "Vanilla Paste" (feat. Fire From The Gods, Chelsea Grin, Guerrilla Warfare)
- Hyro the Hero
  - Kids Against the Monsters (2022)
    - "FU2" (feat. AJ Channer of Fire from the Gods)
- Memphis May Fire
  - Remade in Misery (2022)
    - Only Human (feat. AJ Channer of Fire from the Gods)
- Downstait
  - "Kingdom" feat. AJ Channer of Fire from the Gods (Single, 2024)

=== Music videos ===
Year	Song	Director(s)	Ref.
2013	"Smoke Screen"	Albert Gonzalez	
2014	"The Capitalist"	Albert Gonzalez & John Hale	
2016	"Excuse Me"	Scott Hansen	
2016	"End Transmission"	Scott Hansen	
2017	"The Voiceless"	Ramon Boutviseth	
2018	"Evolve"	AJ Channer	
2019	"Right Now"	Tom Flynn	
2019	"American Sun"	Wombat Fire	
2020	"Break the Cycle"	Wombat Fire	
2021	"Victory (feat. Matt B. of From Ashes to New)"	Wombat Fire	
2021	"American Sun (Reimagined)"	Wombat Fire	
2022	"SOS"	Wombat Fire	
2022	"Thousand Lifetimes"	Wombat Fire	
2022	"World So Cold"	Wombat Fire	
2022	"Love is Dangerous"	Wombat Fire	
2026	"Human"	Tom Flynn	
2026	"Unknown"	Tom Flynn	
