= Kayleigh Goldsworthy =

American singer-songwriter

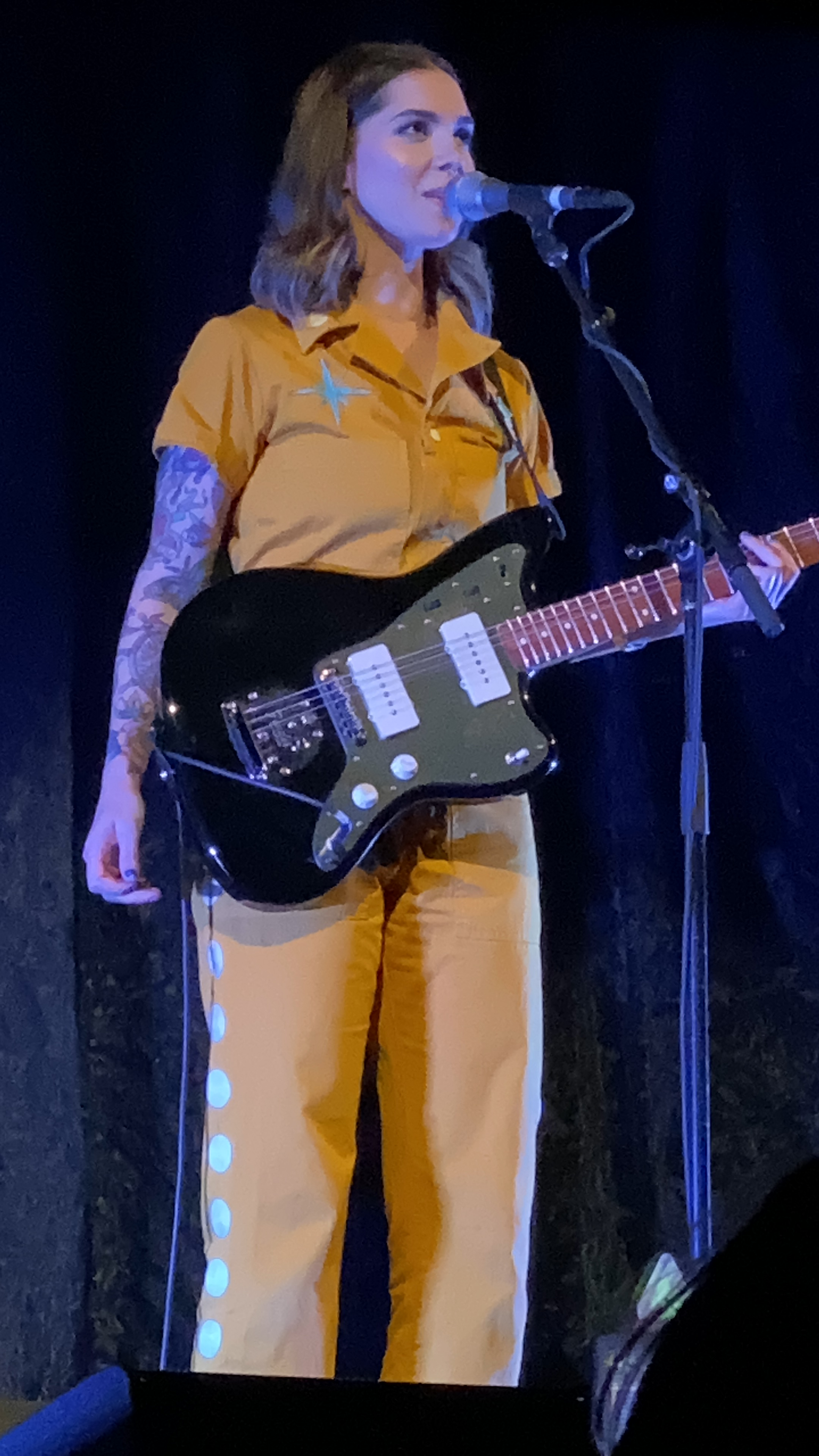
- Goldsworthy in 2019
- Born: Baldwinsville, New York
- Occupations: Singer; songwriter
- Musical career
- Genres: Pop-punk; folk; indie rock
- Instruments: Guitar; violin; piano; vocals
- Formerly of: The Scarlet Ending; Frank Iero and the Future Violents
- Website: kayleighgoldsworthy.com

Kayleigh Goldsworthy is an American singer-songwriter. She co-founded the pop-punk band Scarlet Ending with her twin sister, Kaleena, which released their debut album Cries and Whispers in 2006. Following the band's break-up in 2012, Goldsworthy pursued a solo career, releasing her debut album Burrower in 2013. She released an extended play, All These Miles, in 2018, and her second album, Learning to Be Happy, was released in 2022. She has worked as a touring or session musician for multiple bands, including My Chemical Romance, Front Bottoms, and Against Me!. Her work has been described as indie folk and indie rock, and she plays multiple instruments, including guitar, violin, and piano.

== Life and career ==
Kayleigh Goldsworthy was born in Baldwinsville, New York. She was taught to play the guitar by her father and taught herself how the play the piano when she was young. In high school, she and her twin sister, Kaleena, won their Music Honor Society's talent show and their school's Battle of the Bands competition. They founded the pop-punk band Scarlet Ending while they were in high school, originally starting as an acoustic project. The band released their self-titled debut EP in 2005, later releasing the album Cries and Whispers in 2006. They toured Greenland and Germany for Armed Forces Entertainment in 2008, and toured the Middle East for Armed Forces Entertainment in 2009. They released the album Ghosts in 2010, and that same year, Syracuse.com launched The Scarlet Ending Tapes, a reality web series created by videographer Steven Pallone about the band behind the scenes. The band's final EP, The Things You Used to Own, was released in 2012. The Scarlet Ending broke up in 2012 and briefly reunited for a show in 2014.

Following the band's break-up, Goldsworthy pursued a solo career. In May 2013, she released her debut single, "Where the Summer Goes" onto music sharing site PureVolume. It was the lead single for her debut album, Burrower, which was released later that year. According to her, the album was made over the course of three years. In August, she released "Sparks" as the second single from the album. Her solo band for the record consisted of former Scarlet Ending members Aaron Garitillo and Kiel Feher, as well as Jay Weinberg from Against Me!.

Goldsworthy played with multiple bands following the release of Burrower, either as a touring musician or a session musician. These bands included the Front Bottoms, Against Me!, and the Menzingers. In 2015, she joined Frank Iero's band, Frank Iero and the Future Violents. In 2018, she released the All These Miles EP, which was her first release since Burrower. During the COVID-19 pandemic, Goldsworthy's touring slowed down, leading her to create her second album Learning to Be Happy, released in 2022. She performed as an opening act for the post-hardcore supergroup L.S. Dunes in 2023. Goldsworthy played violin for the American rock band My Chemical Romance during their performance at the When We Were Young festival in 2024, where they performed their album The Black Parade (2006) in full. She later joined the band during their Long Live The Black Parade tour, starting in July 2025, also playing violin.

== Artistry and instruments ==
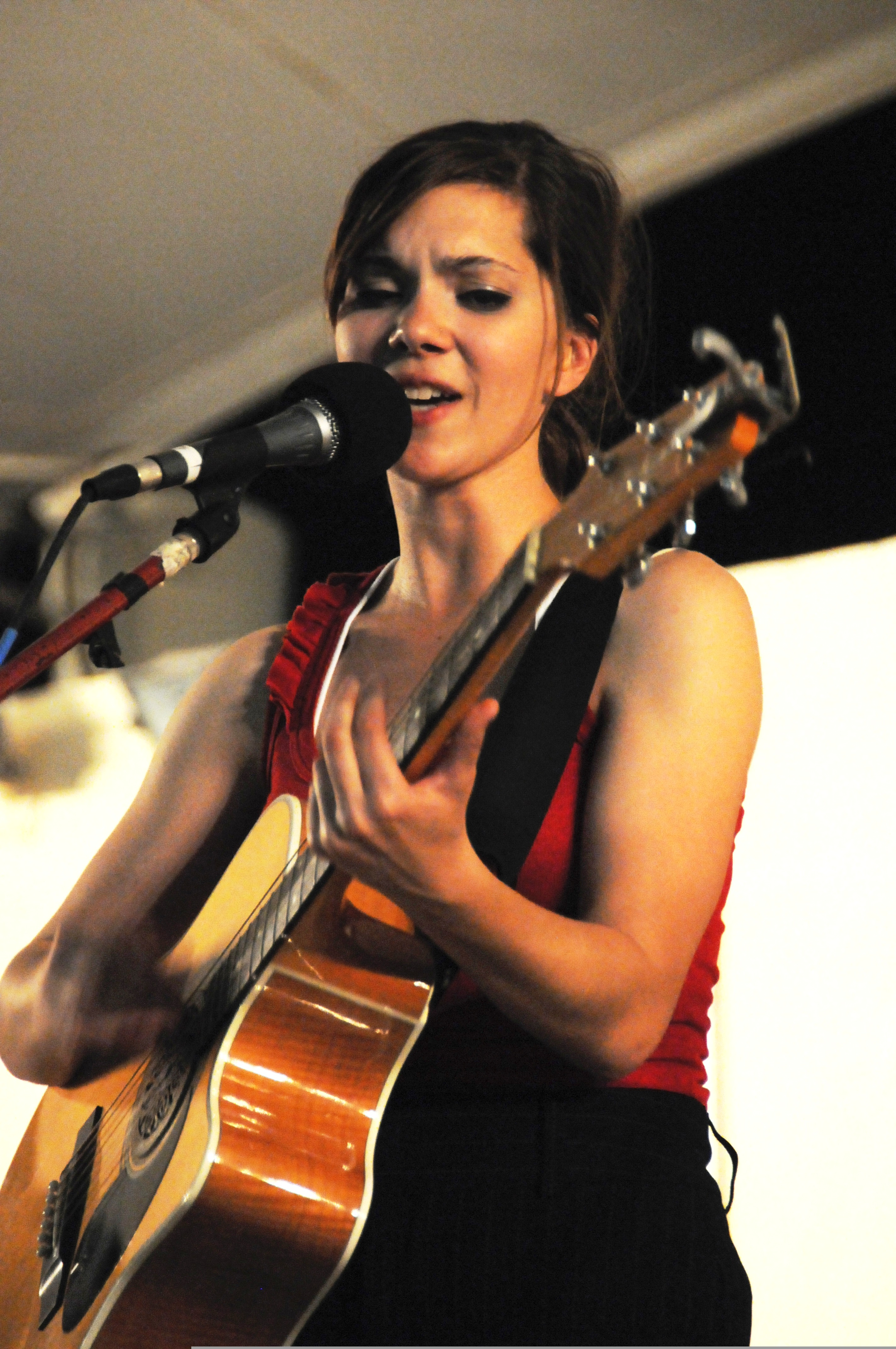
Goldsworthy playing with The Scarlet Ending in 2009

In contrast to the music she performed as part of the Scarlet Ending, Burrower more closely resembled indie folk. With All These Miles, Goldsworthy demonstrated an indie rock sound. She plays multiple instruments, such as guitar, violin, and piano.

== Discography ==
Albums

- Burrower (2013)
- Learning to Be Happy (2022)

Extended plays

- All These Miles (2018)
- Live at Studio 4 (2022)

Singles

- "Where the Summer Goes" (2013)
- "Sparks" (2013)
- "Stuck" (2018)
- "Overambitious" / "Keep The Lights On" (2021)
- "Boomerang" (2022)
- "You're Good" (2022)
