= Up, Up and Away (film) =

2000 television film

- Film poster
- Genre: Superhero
- Written by: Daniel Berendsen
- Directed by: Robert Townsend
- Starring: Robert Townsend; Michael J. Pagan; Alex Datcher; Sherman Hemsley
- Music by: David Michael Frank
- Countries of origin: United States; Canada
- Original language: English

Production
- Executive producer: Paula Hart
- Producer: Harvey Frand
- Cinematography: Danny Nowak
- Editor: John L. Price
- Running time: 78 minutes (90 with commercials)
- Production company: Hartbreak Films

Original release
- Network: Disney Channel
- Release: January 22, 2000

Up, Up and Away is a 2000 superhero comedy film released as a Disney Channel Original Movie. The film premiered on Disney Channel on January 22, 2000. The film is a comedy/adventure about a boy from a family of superheroes who, despite not having any super powers of his own, is called on to save the world.

== Plot ==
Teenager Scott Marshall comes from a family of superheroes, but is the only one without powers, which he hopes will emerge on his 14th birthday. Meanwhile, an activist group called the "Earth Protectors" distribute CD-ROMs about the environment to Scott's classmates, with their programmer, Nina, seeking to use them to educate while her partner Malcolm plans to use them to brainwash people into committing crimes for him. Following a failed bank robbery, he realizes the program only works on children and conducts further tests to confirm and fix this. After Scott loses track of time due to being mesmerized by the CD-ROM, his father Jim Marshall / Bronze Eagle and older brother Adam Marshall / Silver Charge respectively, investigate the bank, but the latter accidentally fries their systems with his electrical powers.

When his birthday comes and he fails to develop powers, Scott pretends he inherited those of his parents' with help from his grandfather Edward Marshall / Steel Condor. When Malcolm uses Nina as bait to lure in Scott's family, his parents and birthday party guests convince him to save her as his first outing as a superhero. However, he loses his mask and almost gets himself and Nina killed until Jim rescues them, having learned the truth from Edward.

Later, Malcolm recovers Scott's mask, matches it to him, and uses an improved CD-ROM to force him to reveal his family's secrets, such as their shared weakness to aluminum foil, before giving Scott a new CD-ROM for his parents to watch. While it ends up with his friend Amy, whose mother watches it, subconsciously robs a bank, and goes to Earth Protectors' HQ, Malcolm uses her to capture Scott's family with the intention of brainwashing them. Upon learning of this, Scott, Amy, and his best friend Randy head off to rescue them with help from Nina, who has realized Malcolm's true intentions. Scott's friends get captured by Malcolm's men, but Scott successfully destroys Malcolm's computer before his family is brainwashed. Afterwards, Adam uses his powers to erase everyone's memories of the Marshalls' identities, though his parents allow Randy to keep his so Scott can have someone to talk to about his abnormal life.

== Cast ==
- Robert Townsend as Jim Marshall / Bronze Eagle, Scott's father
- Michael J. Pagan as Scott Marshall / Warrior Eagle
- Alex Datcher as Judy Marshall / Warrior Woman, Scott's mother
- Kevin Connolly as Malcolm
- Olivia Burnette as Nina, Malcolm's partner
- Sherman Hemsley as Edward Marshall / Steel Condor, Scott's paternal grandfather
- Kasan Butcher as Adam Marshall / Silver Charge, Scott's older brother
- Arreale Davis as Molly Marshall, Scott's younger sister
- Christopher Marquette as Randy, Scott's best friend
- Jamie Renée Smith as Amy, Scott's friend
- Joan Pringle as Doris Marshall, Scott's paternal grandmother
- Nancy Sorel as Mrs. Rosen
- Ty Olsson as Barker
- Scott Owen as Reach
- Benita Ha as Ms. Parker

== Home media ==
The film is available to rent or purchase digitally on Amazon Prime Video, iTunes, YouTube, and Google Play.

The film is also available on the streaming service Disney+.
