= Dead Hooker in a Trunk =

- Film poster
- Directed by: Jen and Sylvia Soska
- Written by: Jen and Sylvia Soska
- Produced by: Jen and Sylvia Soska; Loyd Bateman; Donald Charge; Agnes Soska; Marius Soska; Mary Ann Van Graven
- Starring: Jen and Sylvia Soska; Rikki Gagne; CJ Wallis; Carlos Gallardo
- Cinematography: Loyd Bateman; CJ Wallis
- Edited by: CJ Wallis
- Music by: CJ Wallis
- Distributed by: IFC
- Release date: April 20, 2009
- Running time: 92 minutes
- Country: Canada
- Language: English
- Budget: $2,500

Dead Hooker in a Trunk is a 2009 Canadian horror film starring, written, produced and directed by twin sisters Jen Soska and Sylvia Soska, also known as the Soska Sisters. The film is their feature film directorial debut and is distributed by IFC. The film features music by a variety of local Vancouver acts such as Craig James, Fake Shark - Real Zombie! and CJ Wallis.

== Plot ==
Badass, Geek, and Badass's friend, Junkie, pick up Goody Two-Shoes from his church youth group. Afterwards, they plan to purchase drugs for Badass and Junkie. They discover the dead body of a sex worker in the trunk of the car. Badass and Junkie had been partying the previous night, and do not recall if they killed her. They decide to dispose of the body.

They stay the night at a motel for free, after convincing the motel owner that the sex worker is alive and will exchange sex for the room. Geek calls the police to report her sister for multiple crimes, including having a dead body and drugs in her trunk, as well as an illegal firearm. The police arrive at the motel to question Badass, but offer to let her go in exchange for sexual favors. She knocks them out, handcuffs them together naked, and leaves. She and Geek argue about Geek calling the cops; Badass knocks her out with a punch to the face.

They purchase drugs and use them to pass the time until it is dark enough to transport the body. A street gang assaults the dealer's house, targeting Junkie and the dealer. Badass hears the fighting from outside the house. She rescues Junkie and shoots everyone else inside. Geek tries to call the cops, but an unidentified figure knocks out her right eye with a baseball bat. The four friends escape in their car.

They stop to look at a map. Junkie's arm, which was seriously injured in the fight, is torn off by a passing semi-truck. Goody Two-Shoes is able to sew it back on, and Geek's empty eye socket is covered with an ‘X’ of electrical tape. They try to bury the sex worker, but she sits up, alive. Badass instinctively hits her in the head with a shovel, killing her. Frightened and unnerved, they flee the scene.

The next day, they are attacked by the sex worker's pimp. Badass kills him. Geek and Badass have another argument, and the four friends separate. Badass drops off Junkie at a hospital. Geek and Goody Two-Shoes take separate cabs, but both end up at the sex worker's house. They rescue the sex worker's dog, and learn about a serial killer who has been murdering sex workers. Retrieving Junkie from the hospital, they meet Badass at the sex worker's house. They see someone who matches the killer's description and they capture him. Geek and Badass torture him to death with power tools.

The man they kill is not the serial killer, however. The real serial killer is revealed to be Goody Two-Shoes’ priest. He was maimed by a botched circumcision, leaving him with a forked penis. A frequent customer of sex workers, he was enraged by their reactions to his deformity, and killed them. He kidnaps and tortures Badass. Geek, Junkie, and Goody Two-Shoes try to rescue her. The priest tries to escape, and they chase him. Geek is knocked to the ground. The priest threatens to rape her empty eye socket, but Badass rescues her twin. They set the priest on fire.

The four friends dispose of the sex worker's body by dumping it into the ocean. Geek and Goody Two-Shoes kiss, and Badass suggests they all deserve a vacation.

== Cast ==
- Rikki Gagne as Junkie
- Jen Soska as Geek
- Sylvia Soska as Badass
- CJ Wallis as Goody Two Shoes
- Loyd Bateman as the killer
- Farley M. Gagne as Billy
- Tasha Lee Moth as the hooker
- Carlos Gallardo as God

== Production ==
The film was influenced by the works of director Robert Rodriguez. The Soska Sisters cited his film El Mariachi and his book Rebel Without a Crew as major inspirations. Carlos Gallardo, a frequent contributor of Rodriguez, also appears in the film. The film was shot in Vancouver.
