= Killers in the House =

1998 made for TV film directed by Michael Schultz

- Genre: Thriller
- Written by: Ehren Kruger
- Directed by: Michael Schultz
- Starring: Mario Van Peebles; Holly Robinson Peete; Hal Linden
- Music by: Richard Marvin
- Country of origin: United States
- Original language: English

Production
- Executive producers: Patricia Herskovic; Jack E. Freedman
- Producers: John V. Stuckmeyer; Barry Greenfield
- Cinematography: Bob Seaman
- Editor: Virginia Katz
- Running time: 96 minutes
- Production company: Great Falls Productions

Original release
- Network: USA Network
- Release: November 11, 1998

Killers in the House is a 1998 American thriller television film directed by Michael Schultz and written by Ehren Kruger. It stars Mario Van Peebles, Holly Robinson Peete, and Hal Linden.

== Plot ==
Bank robbers hold a family hostage in a newly inherited mansion.

== Cast ==
- Mario Van Peebles as Rodney Sawyer
- Holly Robinson Peete as Jennie Sawyer
- Michael J. Pagan as Malik Sawyer
- Hal Linden as Arthur Pendleton
- Andrew Divoff as Delaney Breckett
- Josh Holland as Billy Dupree
- Lori Triolo as Kendall Dupree
- Vincent Gale as Louis Sykes
- Dean McKenzie as Parker Henley

== Production ==
The movie was filmed in Vancouver, British Columbia. The film aired on the USA Network.
