= Dan Madigan =

American television producer and author

- Born: United States
- Occupation(s): Screenwriter, television producer, author

Dan Madigan is an American television producer, author and screenwriter. He is known for his work in the professional wrestling industry, including writing and producing for WWE Smackdown.

== Works ==
Madigan wrote the script and novel tie-in for WWE Films' See No Evil (2006).
