= Ben Hollingsworth (actor) =

Canadian actor (born 1984)

- Born: Benjamin Hollingsworth; September 7, 1984 (age 42); Brockville, Ontario, Canada
- Occupation: Actor
- Years active: 2003–present
- Spouse: Nila Myers (m. 2012)
- Children: 3

Benjamin Hollingsworth (born September 7, 1984) is a Canadian actor. He is best known for his role on the CBS television series Code Black (2015–2018) and for his role as Daniel Brady in Netflix's Virgin River (2019–present).

== Early life and career ==
Hollingsworth was born in Brockville, Ontario. He enrolled at the National Theatre School of Canada, where he graduated in 2006.

Hollingsworth has appeared in various television shows, most notably Suits as Mike Ross's rival, Kyle Durant.

== Personal life ==
Hollingsworth married lingerie designer and Barre Method teacher, Nila Myers, on November 10, 2012, after two years of dating. The couple have two sons, born on July 3, 2016, and March 16, 2018, and a daughter born on October 15, 2020.

== Filmography ==
Year	Title	Role	Notes
2003	The Music Man	Honey Moon Couple	Television film
2007	Mayday	Julien Lacaille	Episode: "Desperate Escape/(Miracle Escape)"
2007	Trapped	Roy Hartley	Episode: "Alive in the Andes"
2007	Lovebites	Justin	Season 2
2008	Heartland	Sam	Episode: "Out of the Darkness"
2008	Degrassi: The Next Generation	Devon	Episode: "Owner of a Lonely Heart"
2008	The Cutting Edge: Chasing the Dream	Jason Bright	Television film
2009	The Line	Evan	3 episodes
2009	The Beautiful Life	Chris Andrews	5 episodes Series regular
2009	The Joneses	Mick Jones	Film
2010	A Flesh Offering	Ben Ratner	Film
2011	Diary of a Wimpy Kid: Rodrick Rules	Claudio	Film
2011	Suits	Kyle Durant	2 episodes Recurring
2011	CSI: Miami	Jason Huntsman	Episode: "Sinner Takes All"
2011	Divine: The Series	Father Andrew	3 episodes
2012	Once Upon a Time	Quinn	Episode: "Child of the Moon"
2013	Cult	Peter Grey	6 episodes Recurring Role
2013	Coming Home for Christmas	Mike	Direct-to-video film
2013–2014	The Tomorrow People	Agent Troy	2 episodes Recurring Role
2014	Lucky in Love	Jonah	Television film
2014	Signed, Sealed, Delivered	Charlie	Episode: "Pilot"
2014	Joy Ride 3: Roadkill	Mickey Cole	Direct-to-video film
2015	A Wish Come True	Dave Landry	Television film
2015	Motive	Geoff Armstrong	Episode: "Oblivion"
2015	Backstrom	ADA Stevens Kines	2 episodes
2015	Vendetta	Joel Gainer	Television film
2015–2018	Code Black	Dr. Mario Savetti	Main role Nominated–Golden Maple Award for Best Actor in a TV Series Broadcast in the U.S. (2016)
2017	cannot Buy My Love	Jeff Alexander	Television film
2019–present	Virgin River	Dan Brady	Recurring role (Season 1); Main role (Season 2–present)
2019	Cold Pursuit	Dexter	Film
2019	A Godwink Christmas: Meant for Love	Jack	Hallmark movie
2019	Rabid	Brad	Film
2020	Love Under the Olive Tree	Jake Brandini	Hallmark movie
2021	Debris	Luke Packard	Episode: "You Can Call Her Caroline"
2021	Nancy Drew	Jake Cazine	2 episodes
2021	Joe Pickett	Ote Kelley	3 episodes
2022	A Splash of Love	Ben Winters	Hallmark movie
2022	Romance in Style	Derek	Hallmark movie
2023	So Help Me Todd	Doctor	Season 1 Episode 17
2024	Deck the Halls on Cherry Lane	David	Hallmark movie
2025	The Christmas Ring	Ben Miller	Television movie
