= Kaj-Erik Eriksen =

Canadian actor

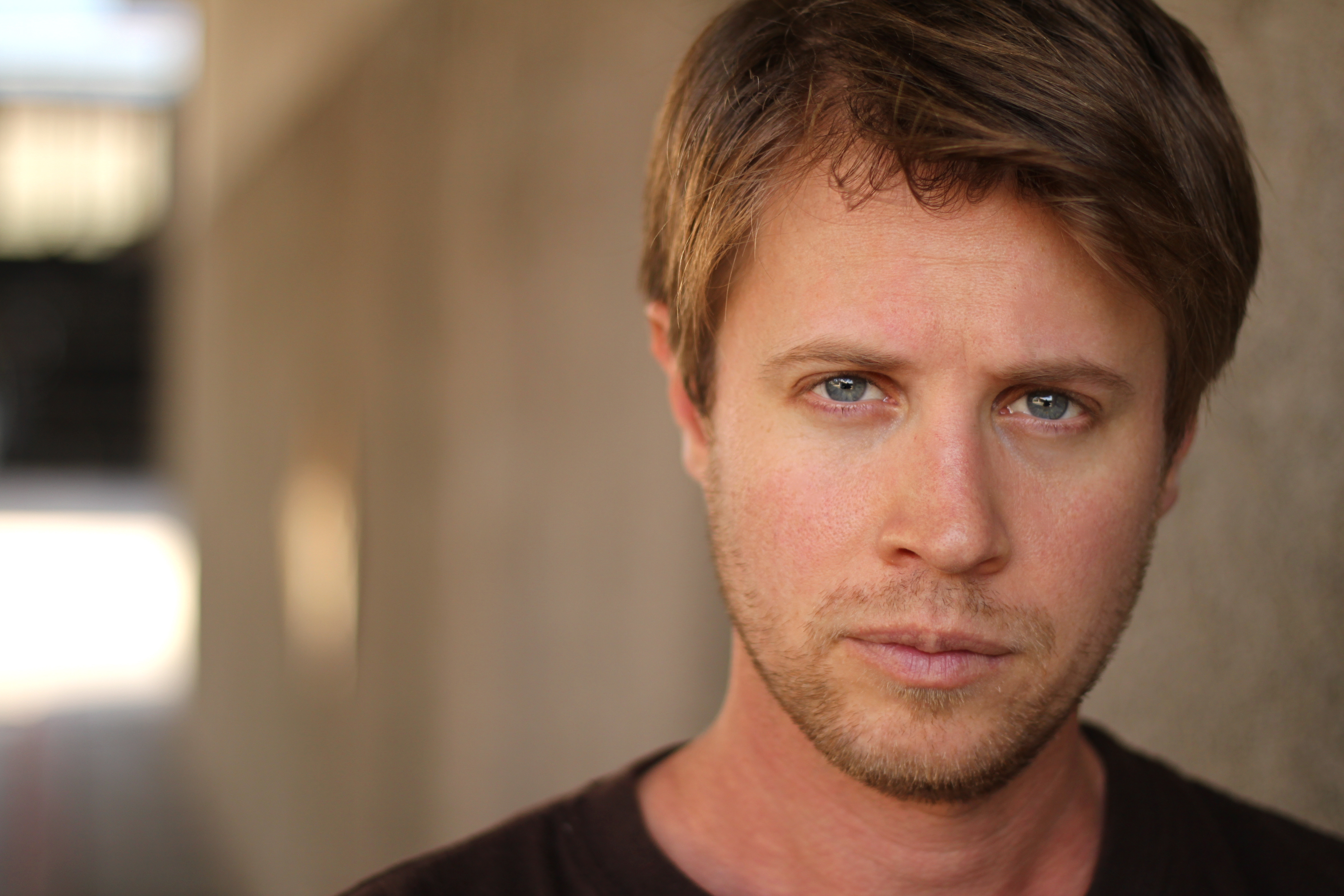
- Eriksen in 2010
- Born: 15 February 1979 (age 46); Vancouver, British Columbia, Canada
- Occupation: Actor
- Years active: 1987–present
- Website: Kaj-Erik Eriksen on Twitter; Kaj-Erik Eriksen on Facebook

Kaj-Erik Eriksen (born 15 February 1979) is a Canadian actor. He is known for his roles as David Scali in The Commish, Danny Farrell in the television series The 4400, and Jeremy Peters in the television series Boston Public.

== Personal life ==
Eriksen enjoys music, and is a fan of the Dave Matthews Band.

Eriksen's father is Danish and his mother is Swedish.

== Filmography ==
=== Film ===
Year	Title	Role	Notes
1989	Quarantine	The Kid	
1990	Short Time	Dougie Simpson	
2002	The Water Game	Clemon	
2007	88 Minutes	Matt Wilner	
2014	See No Evil 2	Seth	
2016	Blood and Dinosaurs	Lee	Short
20??	To Lloyd with Love	Party Man	Short, completed

=== Television ===
Year	Title	Role	Notes
1988, 1990	MacGyver	Jacob Miller, Tommy Wiley	Episodes: "The Outsiders", "The Visitor"
1990	Danger Bay	Stephen Walker, Michael	Episodes: "Live Wires", "Three's a Crowd"
1990, 1992	Neon Rider	Boomer, Harry	Episodes: "Playing with Fire", "Point Blank"
1991	The Girl from Mars	Ricky Swanson	TV film
1991	Monkey House	The Kid	TV film
1991–1996	The Commish	David Scali	Main role
1992	Miles from Nowhere	Patrick Reilly	TV film
1992	The Odyssey	Galileo	Episode: "Galileo & the Gypsies"
1993	Liar, Liar: Between Father and Daughter	Jonah	TV film
1993	Born Too Soon	Ethan Butterfield	TV film
1995	Mega Man: Upon a Star	Proto Man (voice)	English version, TV miniseries
1995	Are You Afraid of the Dark?	Zeke Matthews	Episode: "The Tale of the Dead Man's Float"
1995	Goosebumps	Billy Harlan	Episodes: "Welcome to Camp Nightmare: Parts 1 & 2"
1996	Captains Courageous	Dan Troop	TV film
1996	Poltergeist: The Legacy	Joseph Dawkins	Episode: "The Substitute"
1997	The Journey of Allen Strange	Billy	Episode: "The Visit"
1998	Walker, Texas Ranger	Ted McGee	Episode: "In God's Hands"
1998	Home Improvement	Brian	Episode: "The Write Stuff"
1998	Promised Land	Kevin Neary	Episode: "When Darkness Falls"
1998	Prey	Shane	Episodes: "Collaboration", "Sleeper"
1999	Heaven's Fire	Jeremy McConnell	TV film
1999–2001	Beggars and Choosers	Carey Malone	Recurring role
2000	Miracle on the Mountain: The Kincaid Family Story	Rick Kincaid	TV film
2000	The Outer Limits	Josh Dayton	Episode: "Something About Harry"
2001	So Weird	Inky	Episode: "The Great Incanto"
2001–02	Boston Public	Jeremy Peters	Recurring role (seasons 1–2)
2003	Peacemakers	Jack Morgan	Episode: "The Perfect Crime"
2003	Tru Calling	Cole	Episode: "Star Crossed"
2004	The Dead Zone	J.J. (age 20)	Episode: "Tipping Point"
2004	Star Trek: Enterprise	Smike	Episode: "Cold Station 12"
2004–2007	The 4400	Danny Farrell	Supporting role
2005	NCIS	Frank Smith	Episode: "Red Cell"
2006	Disaster Zone: Volcano in New York	Joey Walsh	TV film
2006	Saved	Elliot	Episode: "Family"
2007	Criminal Minds	Henry Frost	Episode: "Identity"
2008	The Triple Eight	Adolf Hitler	Episode: "Heil Filters"
2009	The Closer	Adam Summers	Episode: "Blood Money"
2009	Ice Twisters	Eric	TV film
2011	Time After Time	Richard Kern	TV film
2011	Perfect Couples	Guy	Episode: "Perfect Exes"
2012	The 12 Disasters of Christmas	Aaron	TV film
2014	Signed, Sealed, Delivered for Christmas	Rob Casey	TV film
2015	Hell on Wheels	Cassius Young	Episode: "False Prophets"
2015	Ties That Bind	Ken Davont	Episode: "The Whole Picture"
2015	A Christmas Detour	Bryce Smith	TV film
2016	NCIS: Los Angeles	Mark Powell	Episode: "Angels & Daemons"
2024	Virgin River	Dr. Hayes	2 episodes
