= The Scarlet Ending =

Defunct American indie rock band

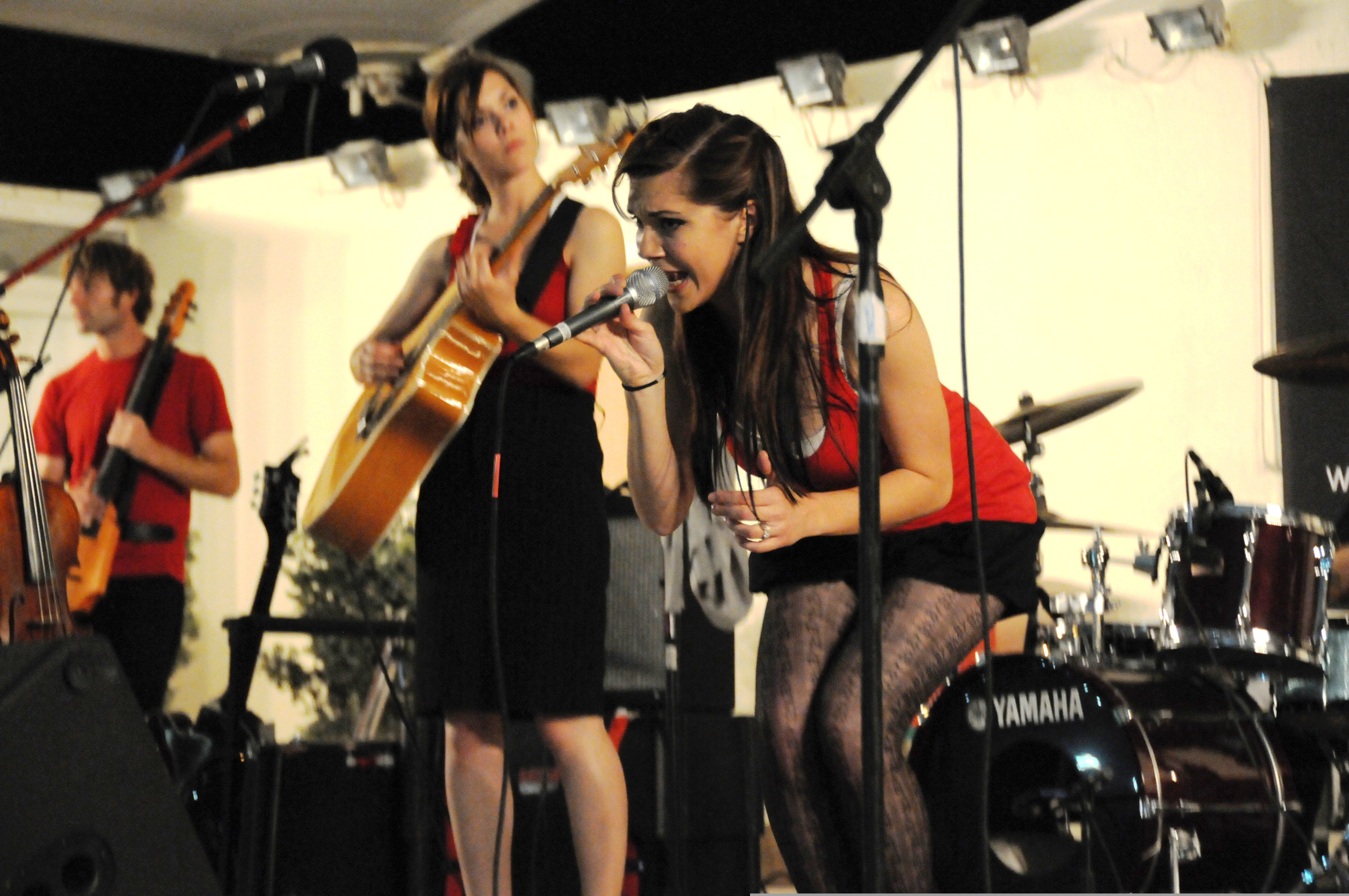
- The Scarlet Ending in 2009

Background information
- Origin: Syracuse, New York, US
- Genres: Indie rock
- Years active: 2002–2012
- Label: Fierce Little
- Past members: Kayleigh Goldsworthy; Kaleena Goldsworthy; Jon Tedd; Jess Hafner; Aaron Garritillo; Nick Streeter

The Scarlet Ending was an American six piece indie rock band from Syracuse, New York, active from 2002 to 2012. The group was fronted by identical twin sisters Kayleigh Goldsworthy (vocals, guitar, violin) and Kaleena Goldsworthy (vocals, piano, accordion, pennywhistle, melodica, ukulele), with Jon Tedd (guitar, vocals), Jess Hafner (cello, synthesizer), Nick Streeter (drums, percussion), and Aaron Garritillo (bass guitar).

== History ==
The Scarlet Ending was started by identical twin sisters Kayleigh and Kaleena Goldsworthy in 2002 when they were in high school. They won their Music Honor Society's talent show and their school's Battle of the Bands competition. The band released their self-titled debut EP in 2004, later releasing the album Cries and Whispers in 2006. In the summer of 2008, the band toured both Greenland and Germany for Armed Forces Entertainment. They toured for Armed Forces Entertainment again in October 2009, this time in the Middle East.

They released the album Ghosts in 2010. That same year, Syracuse.com launched The Scarlet Ending Tapes, a reality web series created by videographer Steven Pallone about the band behind the scenes. The band's final EP, The Things You Used to Own, was released in 2012. The group disbanded in 2012 and briefly reunited for a show in 2014. Following the band's dissolution, Kayleigh Goldsworthy pursued a solo career and Kaleena became a bartender.

== Discography ==
=== Albums ===
- Cries and Whispers – 2006
- Ghosts – 2010

=== EPs ===
- The Scarlet Ending – 2004
- The Things You Used to Own – 2012
