= Roger Dobkowitz =

American television producer

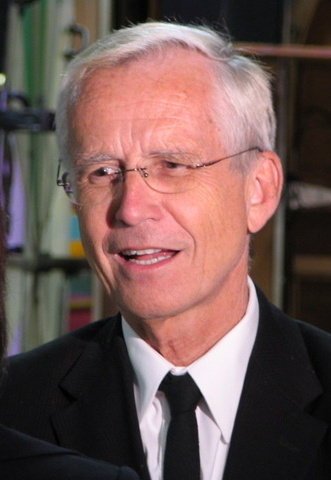
- Dobkowitz in 2007
- Born: July 30, 1945 (age 81); San Francisco, California, U.S.
- Occupation: Television producer
- Spouse: Valerie Dobkowitz (m. 1976)
- Children: 3

Roger Kurt Dobkowitz (born July 30, 1945) is an American television producer best known for his 36-year tenure on the CBS game show The Price Is Right. In addition to The Price Is Right, Dobkowitz also worked on other game shows, such as Family Feud, Double Dare, Now You See It, and Match Game. Dobkowitz graduated from San Francisco State University in 1972 after completing a thesis, A Historical Study of Prime-Time Network Audience Participation Shows 1948–1968.

== The Price Is Right ==
Dobkowitz started as a member of the production staff with The Price Is Right when the show debuted in 1972, and became a producer in 1984. He created eighteen of the show's pricing games (one of which, Gas Money, debuted on the first new episode after his departure). He won five Emmy Awards for his work on the show.

Dobkowitz left Price in July 2008, following production on the show's 36th season. While Variety reported that it was unclear whether his termination was voluntary, Dobkowitz refutes this and says he was terminated, believing the culprit was potentially Drew Carey, Bob Barker's successor as host of the series, after a discussion with top CBS brass.
