= Jen and Sylvia Soska =

Canadian film directors

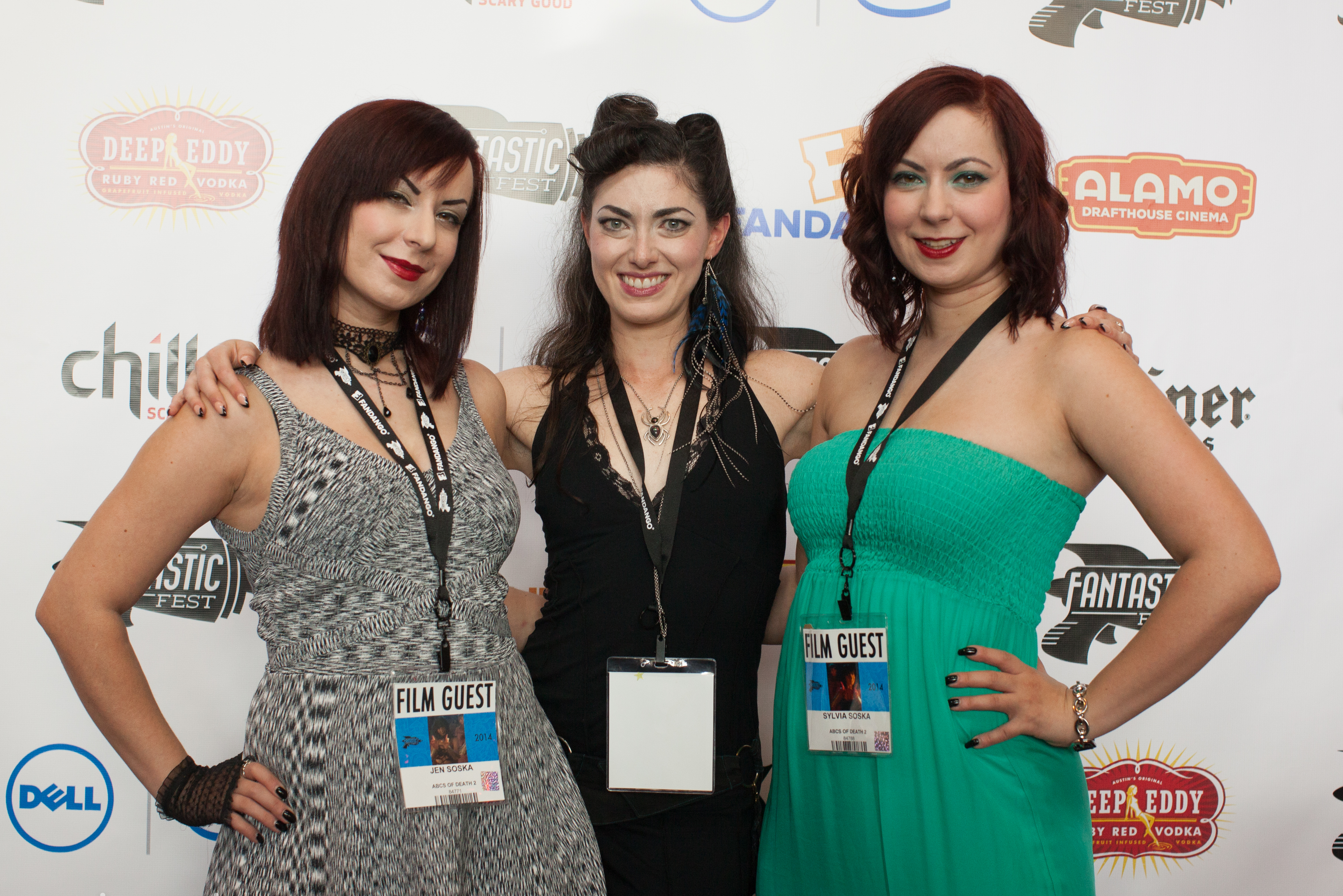
- Jen Soska (left) and Sylvia Soska (right) with actress Tristan Risk (center) at Fantastic Fest, 2014
- Born: April 29, 1983 (age 43); North Vancouver, British Columbia, Canada
- Other names: Twisted Twins, The Soska Sisters
- Occupations: Film directors; producers; screenwriters; actresses
- Years active: 2001–present
- Website: twistedtwinsproductions.net

Jen Soska and Sylvia Soska (born April 29, 1983), also known as The Soska Sisters or The Twisted Twins, are Canadian twin sisters who collaborate as film directors, producers and screenwriters. They are known for directing often violent and visceral horror movies such as Dead Hooker in a Trunk, See No Evil 2 and American Mary.

== Biography ==
Jen and Sylvia Soska were born on April 29, 1983 in Canada. The twins graduated from Argyle Secondary School. Their love of horror began at an early age, when their mother gave in to their constant begging to watch Poltergeist. Initially, they tried becoming actresses and extras, but were unsatisfied with the stereotypical twin roles they were being offered. They decided to work in the horror movie field soon thereafter.

=== Dead Hooker in a Trunk ===
Jen and Sylvia briefly attended film school and wrote and directed Dead Hooker in a Trunk as a final project. The film was shot for $2,500 and released by IFC. It received an overall rating of 80% from critics at Rotten Tomatoes (4 positive and 1 negative review). The twins starred in the film as twin sisters – Badass (Sylvia) and Geek (Jen). Highly inspired by Robert Rodriguez's Rebel Without A Crew, the Soskas sought out El Mariachi star Carlos Gallardo to play the character God.

An absurdist dark satire, Dead Hooker in a Trunk originated as a faux trailer the sisters created, annoyed when their film school cut the budget for their final project. The film had a screening cancelled by one movie theater in Saskatoon after the theater received anonymous complaints.

=== American Mary ===
Following their first project, the twins wrote American Mary which was shown at Film4 Fright Fest, Toronto After Dark Film Festival and Monster Fest. The twins cast Canadian horror star Katharine Isabelle (Ginger Snaps) as Mary Mason, and had special effects created by Masters FX. Wanting to be respectful to the body modification community, the sisters hired flesh artist Russ Foxx as a consultant to ensure authenticity. The film was awarded the Special Jury Award at Fantastic Fest.

Following the success of the film, the Soskas announced an American Mary television series, writing on social media: "I know a lot of you are excited and curious about an American Mary series, after Rabid we connected with Cronenberg's producers at Prospero who have been champions in developing the series. We are currently making a sci-fi thriller called Unseen together with Radar & Film Mode. In the meantime, we have been enjoying connecting with fans of the film and hearing what they want to see in the television series version. It's always been a passion to explore these characters and their lives more deeply. To understand their struggles and see their wins."

=== ABCs of Death 2 ===
The sisters directed a segment in ABCs of Death 2 titled "T is for Torture Porn", which follows an actress, Yumi, as she auditions for an adult film scene. Yumi is revealed to be a hentai monster. The film was produced by XYZ Films.

=== See No Evil 2 ===
Jen and Sylvia Soska made two films for WWE Studios: See No Evil 2 and Vendetta. See No Evil 2 again featured Katharine Isabelle.

=== Vendetta ===
The first film in the Lionsgate and WWE Studios Action Six Pack was the Soska Sisters' action film Vendetta, written by Justin Shady. The film stars Dean Cain as Mason Danvers, who goes into prison in pursuit of the man who killed his wife.

=== Rabid ===
The Soskas co-wrote and directed Rabid (2019), a remake of David Cronenberg's 1977 film of the same name, starring Laura Vandervoort and professional wrestler CM Punk. Rabid had its premiere on the closing night of the 20th Annual Fright Fest in London.

=== On the Edge ===
In September 2022, the Soskas announced the premiere of their new film On the Edge, to take place at the London FrightFest Halloween festival on October 29. The film was shot and produced in Canada and co-stars Aramis Sartorio, Jen Soska, Sylvia Soska and Mackenzie Gray. The festival synopsis of the film reads, "Family man Peter gets more than he paid for when he books a 36-hour session with the sadistic Mistress Satana who seems more intent on making him suffer for his sins. Is it blackmail? Is it torture? Or is it the Devil come for his soul? Will Peter’s faith save him from his own personal Hell or is he already damned? A brilliant depiction of how Kink Culture can heal past trauma and be a source for shocking redemption."

=== Festival of the Living Dead ===
A sequel to George A. Romero's Night of the Living Dead, Festival of the Living Dead was directed by the Soska Sisters in 2023 and released on Tubi April 5, 2024. The film follows Ben's grandkids and their friends 55 years after the incident. The film stars Ashley Moore, Camren Bicondova, Andre Anthony, Gage Marsh, Christian Rose, Maia Jae Bastidas, Keana Lyn Bastidas, and Shiloh O'Reilly.

== Other work ==
The Soskas have written for Marvel Comics, writing a Night Nurse story for Marvel's Secret Wars Journal #5 in 2015, a short story called The Ripley with the Guardians of the Galaxy, and a Deadpool story for the first annual Avengers Halloween Special. They also wrote Black Widow, which ran for 5 issues in 2019. The Soskas wrote Yaira for Rippaverse Comics which released in early 2024.

== Filmography ==
=== Film ===
Year	Film	Producer	Director	Writer	Actor
2001	Josie and the Pussycats				X mark
2008	ReGOREgitated Sacrifice				X mark
2009	Dead Hooker in a Trunk	X mark	X mark	X mark	X mark
2012	American Mary	X mark	X mark	X mark	X mark
2014	ABCs of Death 2		X mark	X mark	X mark
2014	See No Evil 2		X mark		X mark
2015	Vendetta		X mark		X mark
2015	Dead Rising: Watchtower				X mark
2016	The Blackburn Asylum				X mark
2019	Rabid	X mark	X mark		X mark
2022	On the Edge	X mark	X mark	X mark	X mark
2024	Festival of the Living Dead		X mark	X mark	X mark
2026	Electric Meat				X mark

=== Television ===
Year	Show	Actor	Host	Episode(s)
2008	Kyle XY	X mark		"I've Had the Time of My Life"
2015	Hellevator	X mark	X mark	Starring role

== See also ==
- List of twins
