= List of Edgemont characters =

This is a list of characters from the Canadian teen drama series Edgemont which aired on CBC Television in Canada. Edgemont debuted January 4, 2000. These lists are in alphabetical order by last name.

- The following characters have all appeared in the opening sequence of Edgemont as "regulars".
- The season(s) they appear as "recurring" means they weren't featured in the credits, yet still star in the season frequently.

== Main characters ==
Name	Actor	Seasons featured
Tracey Antonelli	Daniella Evangelista	1 (recurring); 2–5 (regular)
Tracey is the desire of many of the boys at A.C. McKinley for her good looks and personality. However, throughout the series, she is attracted to Mark who was always more distracted with his problems with Laurel. Tracey has attempted to reel Mark in numerous times and had succeeded once by hooking up with him while Laurel was in Houston. She also dated Chris in Season Two and eventually falls in love with Kevin at the end of the fourth season. In addition, she is good friends with Kat and helps her set up the teacher evaluations website but admits she's guilty to avoid serious complications. She has a popular radio show in Seasons Four and Five.
Maggie Buckman	Chiara Zanni	1–4 (recurring); 5 (regular)
Always behind Captain Java's counter, Maggie is struggling to make ends meet and receive a solid education after spending her high school years "looking good in tight t-shirts." She gives advice to the other characters about their relationship and school problems. She shares an apartment with Laurel, Shannon and Mark at different parts of the series. She has been dating Jen's brother Derek since high school but breaks up with him after he gets arrested in season one. She then begins on-and-off dating Josh, but eventually breaks it off for good in season five after he insults her intelligence. She and Mark hooked up in the third to last episode and considered sex, but it never happened. She is last seen telling Laurel to leave her apartment as she wanted Mark for herself.
Kat Deosdade	Meghan Black	1 (recurring); 2–4 (regular)
Ouspoken and dark, Kat is a dynamic character. Despite her problems, including the divorce of her parents, Kat is known to escape it on the Internet. She met a man 'Kurt' and as well as "Demonslayer" who turned out to be Gil. She hooked up with Craig in season two, but nothing ever became of it. Throughout the first two seasons, she is not fond of Laurel who she believes broke up Mark and Jen. In season one, she concocted a plan to do teacher evaluations by students through a website, but wound getting expelled from school. She eventually apologizes and is admitted back to school. Although she bounces back and forth between her parents' houses, she eventually moves with her mother to Calgary before season five.
Mark Deosdade	Dominic Zamprogna	1–5 (regular)
Mark is the main character of the series whose personal life is the subject of many plotlines. In season one, his parents are experiencing marital problems that burden the entire family, but Mark is determined to keep his siblings together in the household. He also struggles to keep his grades up in school while helping his mother out around the house. He works at a warehouse from season two onward and considers quitting school to work full-time. While he is happily dating Jen in the beginning of the series, their relationship crumbles as he is attracted more and more to Laurel. They kiss, but she blows him off when he cannot commit. When Mark attempts to break up with Jen, they end up having sex. Jen eventually realized Mark's betrayal and breaks up with him (although she continues to have mixed feelings in season two). He and Laurel date on-and-off throughout the series, but nothing is ever official until the end. He also hooks up with Tracey, Paige and Maggie when there was a lull in his relationship with Laurel.
Gil Kurvers	Richard Kahan	1 (recurring); 2–5 (regular)
Sneaky, selfish and conniving, Gil continually tries to win over the girls at McKinley with no luck. He is Chris's right-hand man in the first season attempting to gain popularity. An aspiring filmmaker and playwright, he produced one play and movie using the other students. He hooks up with Erin at the end of the first season, but she blows him off so he spreads rumors that they had sex. Kevin and he fight over her in season two, but they eventually become friends over the argument. He eventually dates Erin at the end of season four, and they even pull off the grad stunt together.
Chris Laidlaw	P.J. Prinsloo	1–5 (regular)
Popular, athletic and smart, Chris portrays a well-rounded student. However, he had family problems when his mother left him and his sister when they were young, and as a result, visited a psychologist. He makes a bet with Gil in season one that he could have sex with Anika, who constantly thwarted his bad pick-ups. She eventually ruins his reputation by spreading false rumors about him. When Anika runs for president, she uses Chris as blackmail to revive his popularity. He finds Shannon's (she was Anika's presidential competition) poem about her sexuality identity, gave it to Anika and posted it on the Internet. When Shannon confronts him, he says he did not want to hurt her and therefore left the poem anonymous. He began dating Tracey after the Anika incident, but they break up because of the rumors. He gets into a fight with Derek, but oddly enough, finds love with Jen in season three. She becomes pregnant but is unable to carry the baby to term. When she hooks up with Eddie, a guitarist, Chris becomes insanely jealous. At the end of season five, it is hinted that they wanted to start fresh with no more drama.
Bekka Lawrence	Jessica Lucas	2 (recurring); 3–5 (regular)
Bekka is friends with Kat and Travis, the latter she ends up dating in season four and five. She also followed and supported Anika religiously until Anika insults Jen at an executive board meeting. She was interested in Gil but dated Kevin for a while in season four. When she talks to Mark about Travis's poor grades, she develops a crush on him but nothing comes of it.
Scott Linton	Myles Ferguson	1 (regular)
Scott is Mark's best friend who is the first to lay eyes on Laurel. He instantly falls in love with her, but when he attempts to talk to her, he is unable to form sentences. She finds his attraction cute but was not interested. When Scott thought all hope was lost, he meets Brenda. She is Christian, and he attempts to woo her by becoming a Druid. They eventually start a relationship at the end of season one, but due to Ferguson's unexpected death, his disappearance from the series was not explained.
Jennifer 'Jen' MacMahon	Sarah Lind	1-5 (regular)
The second main character of the series, Jen is honest, helpful and independent. Her father passes away before the series starts, and it is explained that she and her brother Derek had a close relationship with him by sharing an interest in blues rock, sports trivia and old cars. She also has an interest in journalism and writes for the school newspaper in seasons two and three. She and Mark begin the series dating, but after realizing Mark was attracted to Laurel, they break up; however, Jen still had feelings for Mark even after he and Laurel began dating. She eventually began to date Chris in season three despite his ill-feelings for her brother Derek. She becomes pregnant in season four and considers abortion, but they both decide to keep the baby. However, it was revealed she had a miscarriage, and they broke up. She began seeing Eddie, a guitarist who decides to leave his band to duet with her. Chris is jealous, but the relationship does not last when his girlfriend shows up. It is hinted at the end of the series that she and Chris will start fresh in their relationship.
Kevin Michelsen	Chas Harrison	2 (recurring); 3–5 (regular)
Kevin is an easy-going guy who just wants to have a good time with his friends. He is a whiz at technology and attempted to break a world record for lying still in season three. He returns from Australia in season two and already attracts the attention of Erin and Brenda, but ends up fighting Gil for Erin's love. He and Gil eventually become friends, and Erin becomes his girlfriend. However, she started hanging on to Mark, which ended the relationship. He goes out with Bekka in season four, but eventually settles with Tracey. He believes he is not good enough for Tracey, but she reassures him that she is 100% attracted to him.
Anika Nedeau	Vanessa King	1–5 (regular)
Anika is callous and considered the source of all gossip at A.C. McKinley. She bothers herself in everybody's personal lives and problems that she eventually alienates herself from her them. In season one, she is the subject of Chris's bet, but when she finds out that he was only interested in sex, she ruins his reputation by spreading nasty rumors. She is also on-and-off best friends with Erin, with whom she constantly uses for school papers, projects and her presidential campaign. While she was elected school president, she damages the position when she is caught plagiarizing (in actuality, Erin wrote the essay for her). She drags Erin down with her for a lesser punishment, and they never revive their friendship since. She dates Craig in seasons three and four, but the relationship never lasts.
Shannon Ng	Grace Park	1–5 (regular)
Shannon is the ultimate good-girl who is actively religious, studious and involved with extra-curricular activities. She is Jen's best friend, and they manage to stay friends through thick-and-thin. In season two, she questions her sexual identity but decides to date Craig. He is enamoured with her, but she does not reciprocate the feelings and breaks up with him. She comes out to Jen, Laurel and Craig initially and even wrote a poem about her "confusion". At the time, she was running for president against Anika, and when she threw out the poem, Chris took it and posted it on the Internet. She confronted him about it, but he said he left it as anonymous. She eventually came out to her parents who kicked her out of the house, but she moved in with Maggie and begin a friendship with a fellow lesbian, Stevie.
Craig Woodbridge	Micah Gardener	1–5 (regular)
Craig is the ultimate activist, but almost always, his campaigns are failures. He first tries to save local, endangered frog species, next allowing Kat back at A.C. McKinley then the Great Bear Rainforest and genetically modified food and finally free speech about homosexuality. He says he is unlucky with the ladies but was able to hook up with Kat in season two and date Anika in seasons three and four for a short time. He works at the warehouse with Mark and Anika in season five but is fired for questioning the health code violations. Also, he is Erin's elder brother, and while they truly care for each other, their constant bickering is portrayed throughout the series.
Erin Woodbridge	Elana Nep	1–5 (regular)
Erin is portrayed as a girl who constantly tries to be someone who can get all the guys and be popular except she is unable to do this herself. She is known as the source for most gossip (she is always seen listening in to conversations at Captain Java or in school). She lags onto Anika to gain popularity, but Anika uses Erin to write essays and do homework. Erin is punished for this in season two when Anika is caught plagiarizing an essay. When they both liked Chris in season one, Erin told Chris that Anika already had used sex to try to dissuade his feelings, but this only backfired because of his bet with Gil. When she threw herself at Chris, he blew her off; Gil took advantage of the situation, and they hooked up. She blew Gil off, and he spread rumors that they had sex, which she had to constantly deny for the rest of the series. Another rumor she had to keep denying was that she had plastic surgery on her nose and breasts; both a source of Anika's maliciousness. She is attracted to Kevin in season two, and he and Gil fight over her. She eventually dates both guys exclusively, and also goes on dates with Mark, Josh and Derek. In the series finale, she and Gil go to Cancun for the grad stunt and moon Anika on TV.
Laurel Yeung	Kristin Kreuk	1–5 (regular)
A transplant from Toronto, Laurel was the new girl in school everyone was talking about. An aspiring filmmaker and model, she was determined to go to NYU to pursue her dreams. She became a source of attraction for Scott, but she was not interested. Anika and Erin immediately became her friends, but when she insults a top Anika had, she became the victim of nasty rumors. Mark became attracted to Laurel, and they shared a kiss. She gave him an ultimatum to break-up with Jen or lose her, but when he goes to see Jen about breaking up, they had sex. However, when Jen finds out about their affair, she breaks up with Mark, and he goes for Laurel. They date on-and-off throughout the whole series, with the source of their break-ups ranging from their pasts, attractions to other characters and forced separations. Laurel stays with Mark when her parents leave Canada, and Kat bares ill-will because she took him away from Jen. She eventually moves in with Maggie, but this is a problem when Mark moves in during season five and causes chaos in the apartment. She and Mark eventually have sex at the end of the series, and she decides to go to university nearby.

== Minor characters ==
Name	Actor	Seasons featured
Travis Deosdade	James Kirk	1–5 (recurring)
The one affected most by his parents' divorce, Travis is known for running away when it gets tough. He does poorly in school and is not interested in helping around the house. He dated Bekka during season five. At the end of the series, it was revealed that he stole money from a fund-raiser, and he was forced to move to Calgary to avoid juvenile detention.
Shelby Derouche	Vikki Krinsky	4 (recurring)
A student who befriends Anika in season four. When Anika used Shelby's talents for her fashion show with no credit, Shelby told her off. She also became the object of Craig's affections, but she did not feel the same way.
Kelsey Laidlaw	Nicole G. Leier	1-4 (recurring)
Chris's sister who befriends Anika and Erin when they use her to get information and embarrassing photos of Chris.
Mitch Leckie	Adrian Petriw	4–5 (recurring)
Paige's brother who has a penchant for bullying. Friends with Travis.
Paige Leckie	Brittney Irvin	4 (recurring)
A warehouse worker who dropped out of A.C. McKinley because of her pregnancy. Mark encourages her to re-enroll, and she struggles to balance school, work and the baby. She and Mark hook-up, but nothing comes of the relationship.
Wayne Litvack	Andrew Robb	3-5 (recurring)
Love for the environment and the theatre, Wayne is the ultimate geek. He is Anika's younger cousin, and he was bullied by Mitch until she spread rumors about his bedwetting. Wayne eventually falls for A.J. who was harboring a crush on him during season five.
Derek MacMahon	Tyron Leitso (season 1) Jeremy Guilbaut (seasons 2-5)	1-5 (recurring)
Troublemaker Derek is Jen's older brother. He was dating Maggie since high school, but they broke up when he was arrested in season one. He was on probation by teaching and coaching rugby part-time at A.C. McKinley until Chris provoked him about flirting with Tracey. He was sent to jail then released in season three when Jen started to see Chris. He refused to get a real job and was always on the prowl for get-rich schemes. He also dated Erin for a short time in season four.
Jordon Rosen	Neil Grayston	2–3 (recurring)
Editor-in-chief of the school newspaper. He had a crush on Shannon.
Josh Wyatt	John Reardon	2–5 (recurring)
Josh was a student teacher at A.C. McKinley that took an interest in Laurel who in turn developed a crush on him. A relationship never culminated as she was still with Mark, and he began dating Maggie. They broke up because he insulted her intelligence. Erin was interested in him for a while in season four.
A.J.	Kyley Statham	5 (recurring)
A shy geek who has a crush on Wayne.
Brenda	Jud Tylor	1-2 (recurring)
A Christian girl who believes in love. She and Scott date throughout the first season and eventually kiss in the last episode; however, the end of their relationship is never explained in season two (because of Ferguson's death). She likes Kevin, and Erin tries to make him dislike her.
Crystal	Chelan Simmons	1-3 (recurring)
Girl who follows Anika and supports her through her campaign. Girlfriend of Sam.
Eddie	Matthew Currie Holmes	5 (recurring)
Guitarist in a band that plays at a club that Jen attends. He encourages her to sing after she requests an older song. He suggests to his band that she could be their singer, but they kick him out. He stays at Jen's, and they start a relationship that quickly ends when his girlfriend shows up.
Sam	Sage Brocklebank	2-3 (recurring)
Brenda's cousin and Crystal's protective boyfriend.
Stevie	Sarah Edmondson	4-5 (recurring)
Stevie is Shannon's first lesbian friend. Shannon develops a crush on her, but she insists they stay friends. When Shannon is asked to talk about homosexuality on Tracey's radio show, she brings up her friendship with Stevie. Stevie becomes furious because while she was out of the closet in A.C. McKinley, her parents were unaware. They eventually go out in the finale.
Tyler	Zahf Paroo	3-5 (recurring)
Son of the owner of the warehouse where Mark, Derek, Paige, Craig and Anika work. He gets into an extortion fight with Anika when she damages his forklift.

== See also ==
- Edgemont (TV series)
- List of Edgemont episodes
