= Chelan Simmons =

Canadian actress (born 1982)

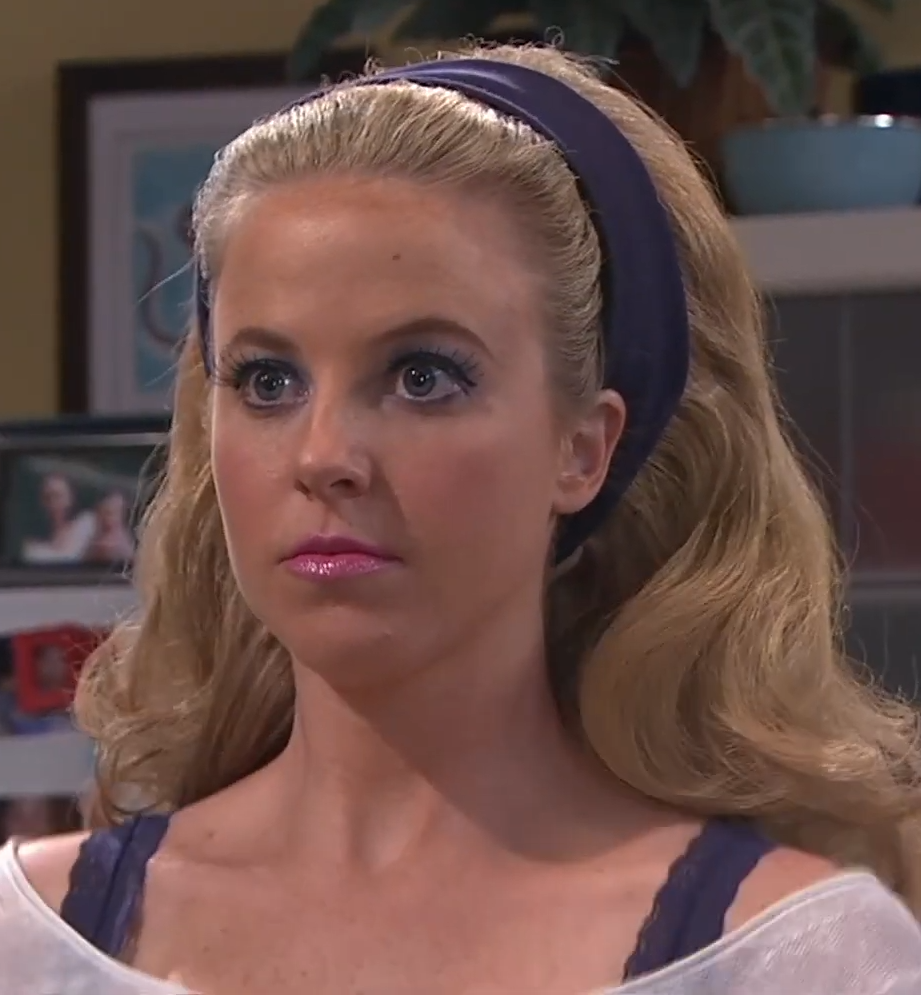
- Simmons in Mr. Young
- Born: Chelan Lauren Simmons; October 29, 1982 (age 44); Vancouver, British Columbia, Canada
- Occupations: Actress; model
- Years active: 1988–present
- Spouse: Greg Street (m. 2015)
- Children: 1

Chelan Lauren Simmons (born October 29, 1982) is a Canadian actress and former professional model. She is known for her role as Ashley Freund in Final Destination 3 (2006), Helen Shyres in Carrie (2002), Good Luck Chuck (2007), and Tucker & Dale vs. Evil (2010). She is also known for her roles in It (1990), Wonderfalls (2004), Kyle XY (2006–2009) and The L.A. Complex (2012).

== Early and personal life ==
Simmons was born in Vancouver, British Columbia, the middle child of three (one younger brother and an older sister). Simmons has been married to Greg Street since 2015. On June 1, 2016, Simmons gave birth to a daughter. Simmons filmed the TV movie Operation Christmas portraying a pregnant woman during her real life pregnancy. Simmons resides in Vancouver and Los Angeles. Outside of acting, Simmons is a dog lover and enjoys cooking.

== Career ==
=== 1990–2002: Modeling and transition to acting ===
Simmons' parents wanted her to become an actress at the age of three but they waited until she turned five to pursue a career. She started modeling and appeared in commercials. Simmons made her TV miniseries debut in It (1990) as Laurie Anne Winterbarger. She went on to star in the 1991 Young Artist Award-nominated family film Bingo, her first theatrical release, and appeared in several television shows as a child star.

=== 2002–2009: Television work and return to film ===
Simmons returned to acting seven years later, giving up her modeling career. Simmons played guest appearances on multiple shows before portraying recurring roles in the MTV show MTV'S Now What? and Crystal in Edgemont for 11 episodes. Simmons has also starred in a number of television films, including Stephen King's Carrie (2002). Due to Simmons' many roles in the horror genre, such as the television films Snakehead Terror and Chupacabra: Dark Seas, she is considered a modern-day scream queen.

In 2005, Simmons was cast in the comedy film The Long Weekend, her first theatrical release in over 10 years. The following year, Simmons starred in the 2006 horror film Final Destination 3, the third installment in the Final Destination franchise. Simmons portrayed the popular Ashley Freund, possibly her best-known role to date. The film received mixed reviews but was a success at the box office and was nominated for awards. It involved Simmons' first nude scene, which she initially didn't want to do. The script required her to be topless during a tanning booth scene. When she expressed her reluctance to director James Wong, he convinced her it was important because it made the scene more realistic, so she agreed. The set was closed off during filming and only the cameraman was present, so it made her and actress Crystal Lowe, who was also topless, feel more comfortable. Simmons also starred in the Direct-to-DVD sequel Dr. Dolittle 3 before appearing in small roles in the teen comedy John Tucker Must Die and the horror Wind Chill.

=== 2009–present: Return to television and further work ===
Simmons won the role of recurring character Hillary in the ABC Family show Kyle XY. She portrayed Hillary for three years until the show was canceled in 2009 after three seasons. Simmons also had a recurring role in the short-lived comedy series About a Girl. Simmons continued her film roles in Good Luck Chuck alongside Dane Cook and Jessica Alba. The film was critically panned. Simmons portrayed Lindsay Lohan in the television film Paparazzi Princess: The Paris Hilton Story. In 2010, Simmons had a small role as a lotus eater in Percy Jackson & the Olympians: The Lightning Thief. The film grossed $226,497,209 worldwide, making it the highest-grossing film Simmons has appeared in to date. Simmons also starred in the critically well received and award-winning comedy-horror film Tucker & Dale vs. Evil.

Simmons landed a regular role on The L.A. Complex as Alicia Lowe, "a sensitive, aspiring dancer from Regina who will do whatever it takes to make ends meet." The show premiered on the Canadian network MuchMusic on Jan. 10, 2012. and aired in the U.S. on The CW. Simmons became a guest star during the shows second season and final season.

Simmons provided the voice for the character Liz Ramsey in the children's animated television show Action Dad which is yet to premiere. At the end of 2012, Simmons had appeared in one episode on the CBS sitcom How I Met Your Mother, before guest starring on an episode of Hannibal in 2013, in which she reprised her role as Gretchen Speck whom she portrayed in the short lived series Wonderfalls. Simmons appeared as Kayla in the horror sequel See No Evil 2 released direct to DVD in October 2014.

== Filmography ==
=== Film ===
Date	Title	Role	Notes
1981	Grandpa Frost	Milasha	Voice, 1993 English dub, part of Animated Classic Showcase
1982	A Toy for Tanya	Tanya	Voice, 1993 English dub, part of Animated Classic Showcase
1984	Pot of Porridge	Gretchen	Voice, 1993 English dub, part of Animated Classic Showcase
1990	Deep Sleep	Young Shelly McBride	Uncredited
1991	Bingo	Cindy Thompson	
2005	The Harp	Girlfriend	Short film
2005	The Long Weekend	Susie	
2006	Final Destination 3	Ashley Freund	
2006	Dr. Dolittle 3	Vivian	Direct-to-DVD
2006	John Tucker Must Die	Crying Waitress	
2007	Wind Chill	Blonde Girl	
2007	Good Luck Chuck	Carol	
2008	Christmas Cottage	Miss Placerville	Direct-to-DVD
2010	Percy Jackson & the Olympians: The Lightning Thief	Lotus Land Waitress	
2010	Tucker & Dale vs. Evil	Chloe	
2014	See No Evil 2	Kayla	Direct-to-DVD
2021	Pennywise: The Story of It	Herself	Documentary film
TBA	Assassins Fury	Susan George	Unreleased

=== Television ===
Release date	Title	Character	Episode
1990	It	Laurie Anne Winterbarger	TV miniseries
1991	Scene of the Crime	Lori	Episode: "Show and Tell"
1991	Captain Zed and the Zee Zone	Little girl (ep. "Curtain Call" and "The Revenge of the Killer Bunnies"), Additional Voices	
1993	The Bots Master	Additional Voices	
1993	Jack's Place	Young Girl (Uncredited)	Episode: "Faithful Henry"
2000	2gether: The Series	Hot Teenage Girl	Episode: "Dead"
2001	Special Unit 2	Naughty Girl #2	Episode: "The Eve"
2001–2002	MTV'S Now What?	Cindy	Recurring role; 4 episodes
2001–2002	Edgemont	Crystal	Recurring role; 11 Episodes
2002	Smallville	Felice Chandler	Episode: "Drone"
2004	Smallville	Rhonda	Episode: "Devoted"
2004	Wonderfalls	Gretchen Speck-Horowitz	Recurring role; 2 episodes
2005	Zixx: Level Two	Louise	2 Episodes
2005	The Collector	The Devil / Spokesmodel	Episode: "The UFOlogist"
2005	Supernatural	Jill	Episode: "Bloody Mary"
2005	Stargate: Atlantis	Mara	Episode: "The Tower"
2006	Psych	Bianca	Episode: Pilot (Credit Only)
2006	Men in Trees	Tiffanii	2 episodes
2006–2009	Kyle XY	Hillary	Recurring role; 26 episodes
2007	Psych	Bianca	Episode: Scary Sherry: Bianca's Toast
2007	About a Girl	Stacy	3 Episodes
2007	Whistler	Model	2 Episodes
2010	Always a Bridesmaid	Savannah Springs	Unaired pilot
2012	The L.A. Complex	Alicia Lowe	Series regular (Season 1), Guest star (Season 2); 8 Episodes
2012	Action Dad	Liz Ramsey / Chartreuse / Courtney / Female Computer Voice / Goth Girl / Cashier	Voice role; 22 Episodes
2012	How I Met Your Mother	Brandi	Episode: "Lobster Crawl"
2013	Mr. Young	Barbie Roboto	Episode: "Mr. and Mrs. Roboto"
2013	Hannibal	Gretchen Speck	Episode: "Amuse-bouche"
2013	Grey's Anatomy	Brenda	Episode: "Do You Believe in Magic?"
2014	Package Deal	Melissa	Episode: "How I Met Your Brother"
2015	Mistresses	Ever	Episode: "Murder She Wrote"
2021–2022	Super Zach	Zach	Voice role; 20 episodes

=== Television films ===
Year	Title	Role	Notes
1992	Bitsy Bears	Whirly / Tickles (voice)	
2000	Ratz	Jennifer Martin	
2001	The Sports Pages	Faith	
2002	Video Voyeur: The Susan Wilson Story	Amber Henson	
2002	Carrie	Helen Shyres	
2004	Snakehead Terror	Amber James	
2004	Monster Island	Jen	
2005	Chupacabra: Dark Seas	Jenny Randolph	
2006	Caved In	Emily Palmer	
2008	Ogre	Hope Bartlett	
2008	Paparazzi Princess: The Paris Hilton Story	Lindsay Lohan	
2009	Malibu Shark Attack	Jenny	
2009	Sorority Wars	Casadee	
2009	Ice Twisters	Nora Elman	
2010	Seduced by Lies	Tia Colton	
2012	A Christmas Wedding Date	Molly Townsend	
2013	Christmas Bounty	Liz	
2014	Wedding Planner Mystery	Nicky Perry	
2014	A Christmas Tail	Tiffany Hardcastle	
2015	Her Infidelity	Courtney	
2015	Love Under the Stars	Amber	
2016	Operation Christmas	Becky Fowler	
2017	Coming Home for Christmas	Sloane	
