= Jazzberry Ram =

Canadian rock/ska band

- Origin: Vancouver, British Columbia, Canada
- Genres: Rock; ska
- Years active: 1993–2003
- Label: Independent
- Members: Allan MacInnes; Drew Stewart; Stephen Stewart; Colin Stobie
- Past members: Vaughn Sohun
- Website: jazzberryram.com

Jazzberry Ram is a Canadian Rock/ska band based in Vancouver, British Columbia.

== History ==
Jazzberry Ram was founded in Vancouver. They began touring internationally in 1993. They completed 14 Canadian and four US tours, playing alongside RUN DMC, Great Big Sea, Nazareth, Big Sugar, Wide Mouth Mason and many more well known acts.

Jazzberry Ram released four albums, and made available several live recordings of their live shows. Their first album, SuperFishyAllahTea sold 10,000 copies. The next album to be released was Jr. Adventure Hr..

The band's third album, That Sound We Make, was released in 1999. The next year the band performed at Manitoba's Shakin' the Lake festival. Jazzberry's most popular song was "Pablo Jack Horner", for which the band released an accompanying video. The band also released videos for the songs "Small Screen" and "Free Beer". They later released the album Landshark.

Jazzberry Ram also opened for Nazareth in Salmon Arm, British Columbia, and co-headlined the main stage of the Dawson City Music Festival with The Rheostatics in 2001. Their songs have appeared in films (Snakehead Terror) and television shows (Higher Ground, Ratz) and the band made their acting debut on Chris Isaac's television show The Chris Isaac Show as an uptight pop band called Sparrow.

In 2011, the band was featured on the Passionate Friar show on CKCU FM radio.
