= Space Milkshake =

- Directed by: Armen Evrensel
- Written by: Armen Evrensel
- Produced by: Holly Baird; Robin Dunne; Rob Merilees; Shane Putzlocher
- Starring: Billy Boyd; Robin Dunne; Kristin Kreuk; Amanda Tapping; George Takei
- Cinematography: Layton Burton
- Edited by: Daryl K. Davis; Fredrik Thorsen
- Music by: Patric Caird
- Production companies: Foundation Features; Trilight Entertainment
- Release date: 26 October 2012; (London MCM Expo)
- Running time: 87 minutes
- Country: Canada
- Language: English

Space Milkshake is a 2012 Canadian science fiction comedy film directed and written by Armen Evrensel. Its cast features Billy Boyd, Robin Dunne, Kristin Kreuk and Amanda Tapping.

== Plot ==
A mutant rubber ducky named Gary terrorizes four workers who are stranded on a sanitation space station. Meanwhile, Earth is inexplicably devoid of life. The crew must now work together to defeat the mutant rubber duck and figure out the strange device that has also appeared on the ship.

== Cast ==
- Billy Boyd as Anton
- Robin Dunne as Jimmy
- Kristin Kreuk as Tilda
- Amanda Tapping as Valentina
- George Takei as Gary (voice)
- Amy Matysio as Wendi (voice)
- Barry Lane as Ground control (voice)

== Production ==
Filming was conducted between 14 November 2011 to 3 December 2011 at Canada Saskatchewan Production Studios in Regina. The project received financial support from Telefilm Canada through the Canada Feature Film Fund.

Rob Bryanton, of Talking Dog Studios, who created some of the sound effects for the film, remarked about the project "that was a weird one, it reminds me of some of the British sci-fi shows from the 70s, it was a lot of fun to work on, that's for sure; the foley department got to do all kinds of fun and grotesque things with bones and KY Jelly." Boyd said since he was also producing the movie, he had a "big part in the cut of the movie and one of Beecake's songs is on the final credits."

When asked about the meaning of the film's title, Robin Dunne stated:

The story is that there is no story! When the script came to me, I read it ... and I liked it a lot and I called my producing partner Rob Merliees and said, I love this, I want to be part of this, but what’s the title? and he's like, I don’t know. I said, Well it doesn't mean anything. and he says, Exactly! and I thought, Okay, I guess so – so people see the title and they go, What does that mean? and basically, it means nothing. It means nothing or it means everything.

== Release ==
The world premiere was held at the London MCM Expo on 26 October 2012. Actors Robin Dunne and Billy Boyd were at the premiere for a question and answer session.

The film premiered on Canadian television channel The Movie Network on 8 February 2013 and aired on Movie Central in Canada starting on 22 March 2013. The film also screened at film festivals in February 2013; the film also screened at the Armageddon Expo in Melbourne, Australia on 19 October 2013 and Auckland, New Zealand on 26 October 2013.

== Reception ==
John Gormley of The StarPhoenix said the "Saskatchewan-made movie wasn't just bad, it was bloody awful." Critic Richard Scheib wrote "the film grasps at some big concepts – the end of all life on Earth, travel between alternate dimensions/timelines, artifacts with world-destroying potential – but never depicts any of this or does much more than go beyond its space station sets; the digital effects are economical but passable for the film's needs, although the rubber duck monster often looks cheap and cheesy."
