= Kristin Kreuk =

Canadian actress (born 1982)

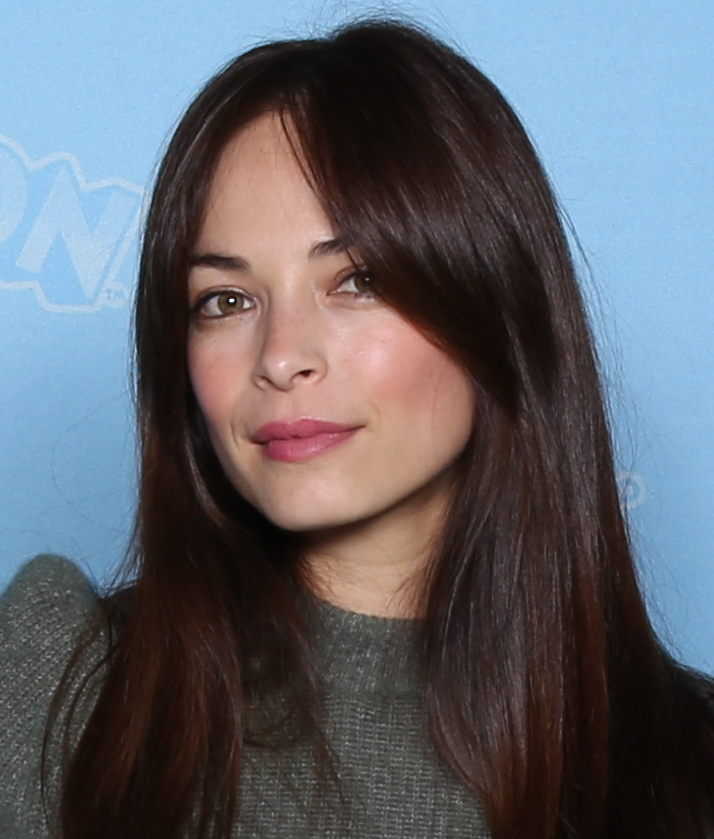
- Kreuk in 2022
- Born: Kristin Laura Kreuk; December 30, 1982 (age 43); Vancouver, British Columbia, Canada
- Occupations: Actress; producer
- Years active: 1999–present

Kristin Laura Kreuk (/kruːk/; born December 30, 1982) is a Canadian actress. Debuting on teen drama Edgemont, she became most known for her television roles as Lana Lang in the superhero television series Smallville (2001–2009), Catherine Chandler in The CW sci-fi series Beauty & the Beast (2012–2016) and as Joanna Hanley in the CBC legal drama series Burden of Truth (2018–2021). In 2009, she portrayed Chun-Li in the American martial arts film Street Fighter: The Legend of Chun-Li.

== Early life ==
Kreuk was born in Vancouver, British Columbia, to Deanna Che and Peter Kreuk, two landscape architects. Her father is of Dutch descent. Her mother is of Chinese descent, born in Indonesia. Her maternal grandmother was Chinese Jamaican. Her mother and grandmother lived in Singapore and the Solomon Islands before settling in Vancouver. She has a younger sister, Justine Kreuk. Kreuk trained in karate and gymnastics at the national level until high school but quit in grade 11 due to scoliosis. Kreuk was planning to study forensic science or psychology at Simon Fraser University and was surprised when a casting director for the CBC television series Edgemont contacted her at her high school.

== Career ==
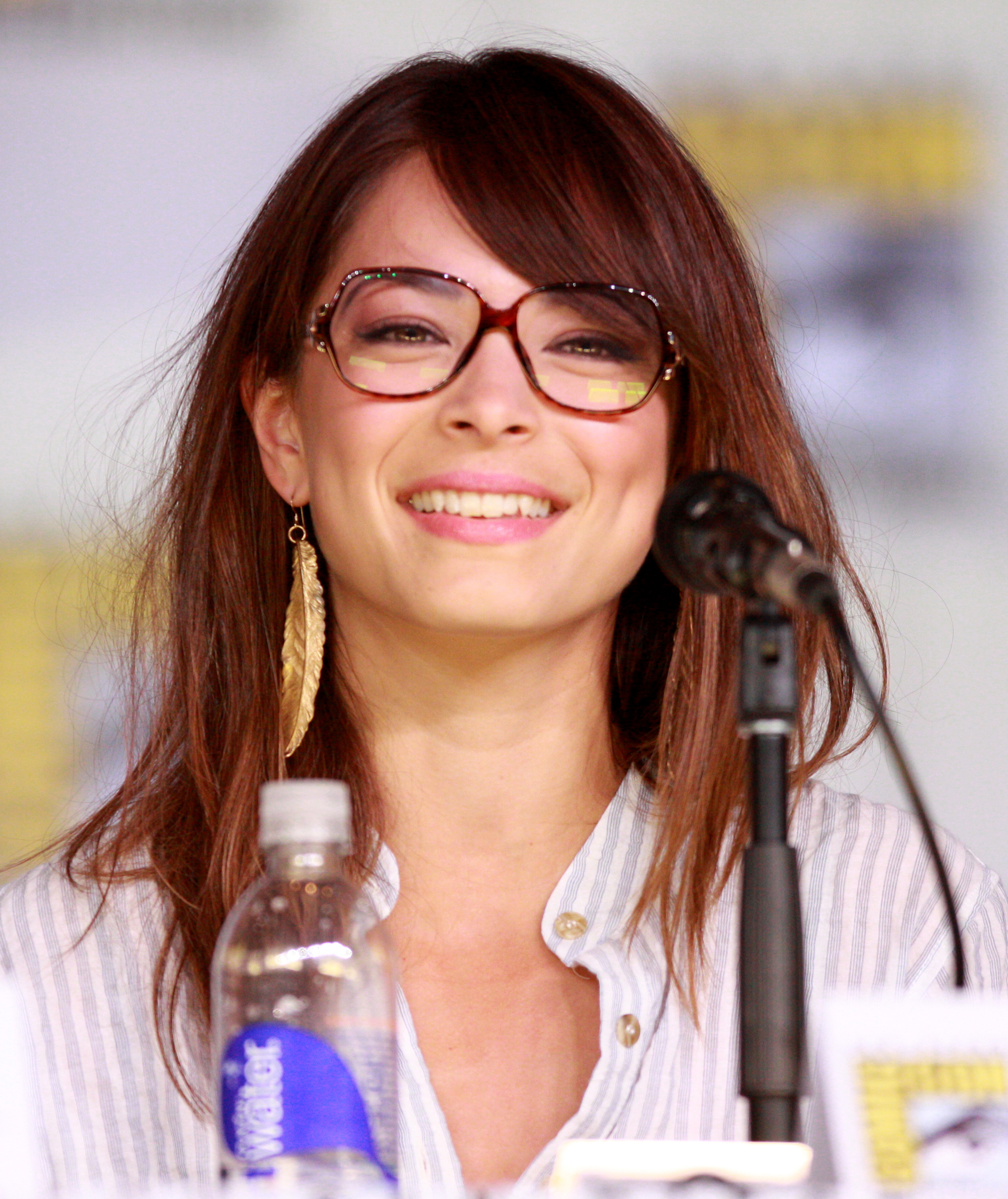
Kreuk at the 2013 San Diego Comic-Con

After filming the first season of the teenage soap opera Edgemont in 2000, Kreuk hired an agent. She landed the lead role of Snow White in a TV movie, Snow White: The Fairest of Them All (2001), which aired on ABC and was released on DVD in 2002.

After Snow White, Kreuk's agent sent an audition tape to screenwriters Alfred Gough and Miles Millar, who at the time were putting together the cast of a show they had created for the WB Network (now The CW) entitled Smallville. The series, which was slated to be shot in Vancouver, revolves around the life of teenager Clark Kent before he becomes Superman. Gough and Millar called Kreuk to WB's studios in Burbank, California to audition for the role of Clark Kent's first love, Lana Lang, and she was later cast in the part. The series premiered in October 2001. For a while, Kreuk was starring on both Smallville and Edgemont, although her role on Edgemont slightly diminished over time. Edgemont ended its run in 2005. After seven seasons, Kreuk left Smallville in the beginning of 2008, when her character leaves town. She returned as a guest star in the show's eighth season for five episodes to conclude her storyline.

In 2003, Neutrogena made Kreuk their spokesmodel for their worldwide advertising campaign. In 2005, she renewed her contract with Neutrogena for another two years, becoming the company's longest-serving model spokesperson.

Kreuk appeared in the comedy film EuroTrip (2004), playing the girlfriend who cheats on the protagonist with a musician (played by Matt Damon).

In mid-2004, Kreuk took the role of Tenar for the Sci-Fi Channel's two-part miniseries Earthsea. The miniseries was filmed in Vancouver, directed by Robert Lieberman and broadcast on December 13, 2004.

In early 2005, Kreuk signed on to the Canadian independent film Partition (2007), playing Naseem, a vulnerable 17-year-old whose world is shattered by the trauma of the Partition of India in 1947; the character also falls in love with an ex-British Indian Army officer. In the summer of 2006, Kreuk starred in the short film, Dream Princess by comic book writer/artist Kaare Andrews. The film is a modern sci-punk retelling of the tale of Sleeping Beauty, with a twist. However, it never aired. Kreuk starred in the film Street Fighter: The Legend of Chun-Li (2009), in which she played the title character, Chun-Li. She tested for the sequel Mission: Impossible – Ghost Protocol (2011), with the role going to Paula Patton.

In 2009, Kreuk signed on for a multi-episode arc in season three of Chuck. She played Hannah, a computer troubleshooter who joins the Buy More Nerd Herd after being laid off from her previous job.

In 2010, she portrayed Judah Ben-Hur's sister Tirzah in the TV movie Ben Hur, which aired in Canada and later on ABC in the United States.

Kreuk was involved with two pilots that did not get picked up: a 2010 CBS sitcom entitled Hitched (which was co-created by Josh Schwartz, who was also the creator of Chuck) and a 2011 NBC drama series called 17th Precinct, which was made by Ronald D. Moore.

In February 2012, Kreuk was announced as the lead female character in The CW's reboot of Beauty & the Beast, which was picked up on May 11, 2012, and started airing in fall 2012. The CW announced in October 2015 that the show's upcoming fourth season, scheduled to air over the summer of 2016, would be its final season. The series finale aired on August 25, 2016.

In 2018, Kreuk played the lead role in Burden of Truth, a CBC Television production in which she portrays a "big-city lawyer who takes on a case for a group of sick girls in her hometown". The show premiered on January 10, 2018. On April 5, 2018, The CW announced that they had acquired the rights to air the show beginning in summer 2018. CBC has renewed Burden of Truth for a fourth season. The series concluded in 2021 after four seasons.

In 2024, Kreuk was cast as the lead female character in Murder in a Small Town, which airs on Global in Canada, and Fox in the United States. In 2025, the series was renewed for a second season, with Kreuk reprising her starring role as Cassandra Lee.

In a February 2010 interview, Kreuk stated that she and Rosena Bhura, whom Kreuk met on the set of Partition, started a production company called Parvati Creative Inc, which focuses on "human-centric films as seen through a female lens". Parvati's first production was a short film directed by Rick Rosenthal called Blink, of which Kreuk is listed as an executive producer. The second project was a comedy web series titled Queenie which featured Kreuk's friend Olivia Cheng.

In 2011 Kreuk appeared in the Japanese horror film Vampire. In 2010, Kreuk also starred in the music video "I Heard" by musician Hill Zaini.

Kreuk stars as Heather in the film Irvine Welsh's Ecstasy (2011), based on Irvine Welsh's novel. She also stars as Tilda in the science fiction comedy film Space Milkshake (2012). In August 2017, Kreuk provided the voice for Princess Shuyan in Shuyan Saga, a graphic novel series set in an ancient Chinese martial arts fantasy universe. She also reprised her role as Catherine Chandler from Beauty & the Beast on Robot Chicken.

In March 2026, Titan Comics announced that it would be publishing Black Star, a five-issue, Gothic science fiction horror/fantasy noir comic book miniseries written by Kreuk, actor Peter Mooney, and screenwriter Eric Putzer, who conceived of the idea when they worked together on Burden of Truth. Described as "a Northern Gothic Noir tinged with horror and dark humor", which combines elements from survivalist epics like The Revenant and magical quest stories such as Harry Potter and the Deathly Hallows: Part 1, the comic book is set in early 19th century Winnipeg, and follows a man named Dashiell Carlyle who, admist skirmishes between two warring factions in the fur trade, discovers that he has magical abilities, and that a secret order of other magic users that recruits him intends to use those powers to remake the world into a utopia at the cost of many innocent lives. The first issue of the series, which marks the first comics work by the three creators, was released on July 29, 2026 to positive reviews.

== Personal life ==
Kreuk holds a purple belt in Shotokan karate, and is learned in acrobatics and wushu.

Kreuk moved back to Vancouver in September 2022, after living in Toronto for a few years to study for her undergraduate degree and to pursue producing opportunities. She stated on Live with Kelly and Michael in October 2012 that she is a pescetarian.

In April 2018, her Smallville co-star Allison Mack was arrested for her involvement in NXIVM, a cult founded by Keith Raniere. Mack stated in November 2025 that Kreuk had introduced her to NXIVM in 2006. In March 2018, following Raniere's arrest, Kreuk had previously disclosed on her Twitter account that she had joined NXIVM in 2006, when she was 23, believing it was a "self-help" group but left in 2013, and had not witnessed any illegal or nefarious activities during her time in the group. Kreuk's statement was backed by actress and former NXIVM member Sarah Edmondson, who left in 2017 and helped expose its activities.

== Filmography ==
=== Television ===
Year	Title	Role	Notes
2001	Snow White: The Fairest of Them All	Snow White	Television film
2001	The Weekenders	Gina	Episode: "My Punky Valentine"; voice role
2001–2005	Edgemont	Laurel Yeung	Main role; 67 episodes
2001–2009	Smallville	Lana Lang	Main role (seasons 1–7, recurring season 8); 154 episodes
2001–2009	Smallville	Louise McCallum	Episode: "Relic"
2001–2009	Smallville	Margaret Isobel Thoreaux	3 episodes
2004	Earthsea	Tenar	Television miniseries
2010	Ben Hur	Tirzah	Television mini-series
2010	Chuck	Hannah	Recurring role; 4 episodes
2012–2016	Beauty & the Beast	Catherine Chandler	Main role; 70 episodes, also producer
2015	Robot Chicken	Oblina / Catherine Chandler	Episode: "Ants on a Hamburger"; voice role
2018–2021	Burden of Truth	Joanna Hanley, later Joanna Chang	Main role, also executive producer
2021	Ghostwriter	Sarah Weaver	Guest role (season 2)
2022	Reacher	Charlene "Charlie" Hubble	4 episodes
2024–2025	Murder in a Small Town	Cassandra Lee	Main role

=== Film ===
Year	Title	Role	Notes
2004	EuroTrip	Fiona	
2006	Dream Princess	Princess	Short film
2007	Partition	Naseem Khan	
2009	Street Fighter: The Legend of Chun-Li	Chun-Li	
2011	Vampire	Maria Lucas	
2011	Irvine Welsh's Ecstasy	Heather Thompson	
2012	Space Milkshake	Tilda	also executive producer
2017	The Emissary	The Emissary	Short film

=== Video games ===
Year	Title	Role	Notes
2017	Shuyan Saga	Shuyan	voice role
2020	Watch Dogs: Legion	Kaitlin Lau	Voice and performance capture

=== Producer ===
Year	Title	Notes
2011	Blink	Short film; also executive producer
TBA	Phoolan	Documentary film; post-production, also executive producer

== Awards and nominations ==
In 2015, Kreuk was ranked as Canada's most beautiful person in an online poll organized by ET Canada.

Year	Association	Category	Work	Result	Ref.
2002	Saturn Awards	Best Actress in a Television Series	Smallville	Nominated	
2003	Saturn Awards	Best Actress in a Television Series	Smallville	Nominated	
2003	Teen Choice Awards	Choice TV Actress: Action	Smallville	Nominated	
2004	Teen Choice Awards	Choice TV Actress: Action	Smallville	Nominated	
2004	Saturn Awards	Best Actress in a Television Series	Smallville	Nominated	
2005	Leo Awards	Best Actress in Feature Length Drama	Earthsea	Nominated	
2005	Leo Awards	Best Performance in Youth's Series	Edgemont	Nominated	
2006	Teen Choice Awards	Choice TV Actress: Action/Drama	Smallville	Nominated	
2006	Saturn Awards	Best Actress in a Television Series	Smallville	Nominated	
2008	Teen Choice Awards	Choice TV Actress: Action	Smallville	Nominated	
2009	Teen Choice Awards	Choice TV Actress: Action	Smallville	Nominated	
2013	Teen Choice Awards	Choice TV Actress: Fantasy/Sci-Fi	Beauty & the Beast	Nominated	
2014	Teen Choice Awards	Choice TV Actress: Fantasy/Sci-Fi	Beauty & the Beast	Nominated	
2014	People's Choice Awards	Favorite Sci-Fi/Fantasy TV Actress	Beauty & the Beast	Won	
2015	People's Choice Awards	Favorite Sci-Fi/Fantasy TV Actress	Beauty & the Beast	Won	
2019	Rockie Awards	Canadian Award of Distinction	Burden of Truth, EuroTrip, Smallville	Won	
2019	Canadian Screen Awards	Best Lead Actress, Drama Series	Burden of Truth	Nominated	
2021	Canadian Screen Awards	Best Lead Actress, Drama Series	Burden of Truth	Nominated	
2025	Leo Awards	Best Lead Performance Dramatic Series	Murder In A Small Town	Won	

== See also ==
- Chinese Canadians in Greater Vancouver
