= Tara Gereaux =

Canadian Author

Tara Gereaux (born June 7, 1975) is a Métis radio producer and writer from Canada.

== Background ==
Originally from Fort Qu'Appelle, Saskatchewan, she lived for a time in Winnipeg, Manitoba, in her teens.

She studied creative writing at the University of British Columbia, and worked as a writer and story editor in television for a number of years, most notably on the television series Robson Arms and Edgemont.

== Writing ==
She subsequently moved back to Regina, where she published her debut young adult novella, Size of a Fist, in 2015. The book received two Saskatchewan Book Award nominations in 2016.

She followed up in 2021 with the novel Saltus, which was a ReLit Award nominee in the Fiction category in 2022.

Her third book, Wild People Quiet, was published in 2026. Based in part on Gereaux's own family history of being open about their Métis heritage only behind closed doors, the novel centres on a Métis woman who hides her identity for many years. The book was shortlisted for the 2026 Giller Prize.

== Works ==
- Size of a Fist - 2015
- Saltus - 2021
- Wild People Quiet - 2026
