= Wind Chill (film) =

2007 supernatural horror film

- Theatrical release poster
- Directed by: Gregory Jacobs
- Written by: Joe Gangemi; Steven A. Katz
- Produced by: Graham Broadbent; Peter Czernin
- Starring: Emily Blunt; Ashton Holmes; Martin Donovan
- Cinematography: Dan Laustsen
- Edited by: Lee Percy
- Music by: Clint Mansell
- Production companies: TriStar Pictures; Blueprint Pictures; Section Eight Productions
- Distributed by: Sony Pictures Releasing
- Release dates: April 27, 2007 (United States); August 3, 2007 (United Kingdom & Ireland)
- Running time: 90 minutes
- Countries: United Kingdom; United States
- Language: English
- Box office: $285,060

Wind Chill is a 2007 supernatural horror film directed by Gregory Jacobs and starring Emily Blunt and Ashton Holmes. The film was produced by the British Blueprint Pictures company, and George Clooney and Steven Soderbergh's joint company Section Eight Productions supported the project financially. The film opened in limited distribution in April 2007 in the United States, was released in the United Kingdom and Ireland in August 2007, but went directly to DVD in most other markets.

== Plot ==
A student ("Girl") at a Pennsylvania university finds through the campus rideshare board a ride home to Wilmington, Delaware for Christmas. She joins another student ("Guy"), who is driving home to Wilmington and seems to know a lot about her. They have a class together, but she never noticed him.

They stop at an isolated gas station so that Girl can use the bathroom.

In the restroom, the door gets stuck, and while pounding on it, she hears Guy and the clerk talking and acting as if they do not hear her. She manages to force the door open and angrily asks them why they did not let her out. The two men seem puzzled.

Guy continues the journey with Girl and eventually leaves the highway, opting for a route marked with accident crosses. He says it is a scenic shortcut. Girl figures out that Guy has lied about living in Delaware and demands him to explain himself when suddenly he swerves to avoid a car racing straight toward them. The pair crashes and ends up buried in a snowdrift. The other car disappears, leaving no tire tracks. While Guy walks back to the gas station, Girl stays inside his broken car and sees a dark figure nearby. She calls out but to no avail.

Guy returns, saying the gas station is closed, but she can tell that he is lying.

Huddling in the car, Guy admits he had been interested in her, and when he saw that she was needing a ride to Delaware, he saw a chance to meet her and begin a relationship.

The pair thinks help has arrived when a cop arrives and knocks on their window. He acts as if they are just "parking" there. Girl believes he is a corrupt cop looking for a bribe. When the cop violently drags her to the back of his old-fashioned car, Guy hits him with a tire iron. They both jerk awake, finding that Guy's hands are frostbitten. She realizes Guy was injured in the car crash but had been hiding it.

The cop keeps reappearing, always heralded by an old Christmas song on the radio. Girl dreams of the many people the cop has killed and of priests.

Girl has the idea to use an old telephone and the junction box on a nearby telephone pole to call for help. She climbs the pole, connects the telephone, and reaches 911 but is unsure if they can hear her. Returning to the car, she discovers Guy has died.

Girl sees headlights approaching, thinking that it is the cop, but it turns out to be a snow-plow driver responding to her call. The driver puts Guy's body on the back of the snow-plow and leaves with Girl. While driving, he tells her that in the 1950s, a corrupt cop murdered people on that stretch of road and that their bodies were never found. In 1953, he ran a young couple off the road but lost control and crashed in the ravine. Around Christmas every year, people usually die on that road. In 1961, priests were found frozen to death.

The cop then runs them off the road. Despite Girl's pleas, the driver gets out to help the cop, whose car has fallen into the ravine. Girl follows him, and the pair sees the two burning cars from 1953. The ghosts of the priests walk down to the trapped cop but instead of helping him, they pull the microphone from his radio, leaving him to die. His burned body crawls out and freezes the plowman to death.

Girl runs back to the truck and tries to start it, but the cop reappears. Guy's ghost also appears, hitting the cop with a tire iron.

She jerks awake and realizes she is back in the car, next to Guy's body. Guy's ghost reappears and leads her through the ruined priests' home nearby, to the gas station.

Hours later, coroners load Guy's body into a van as a paramedic attends Girl, who is now safe.

== Cast ==
Note: No character in the film is ever named.

- Emily Blunt as Girl
- Ashton Holmes as Guy
- Martin Donovan as Highway Patrolman
- Ned Bellamy as Snowplow Driver
- Chelan Simmons as Blonde Girl

== Filming locations ==
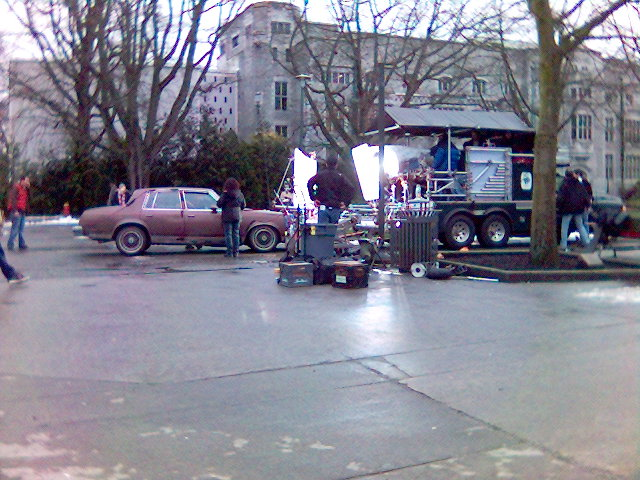
Wind Chill being filmed on location at the University of British Columbia near Vancouver.

The college scenes in the film were shot at the University of British Columbia near Vancouver, British Columbia, Canada. Outdoor scenes of the movie were shot near Peachland, British Columbia, in February and March 2006.

== Release ==
=== Home media ===
The film was released on DVD by Sony Pictures Home Entertainment on September 4, 2007, in a 2-disc set. In the UK it was available with special holographic sleeve.

The film debuted on Blu-ray for the first time in the US on April 4, 2017, by Mill Creek Entertainment. It is included as part of a 3-pack alongside Perfect Stranger (2007) and Straightheads (2007).

== Reception ==
Rotten Tomatoes gave Wind Chill an approval rating of 44% based on reviews from 25 critics. The site's consensus states: "Wind Chill is a ghost story with a clunky and unpolished script that fails to keep viewers in suspense." Metacritic rates it at 52 out of 100 based on reviews from 7 critics, indicating "mixed or average" reviews.

Justin Chang of Variety called it an "intermittently effective thriller" and "a rickety vehicle for its two perfectly cast leads". Andy Webster of The New York Times called it "A moody, spooky tale, rendered with laudable economy." TV Guide gave the film two stars out of five. BBC also gave two stars out of five.

== See also ==
- Holiday horror
- List of films set around Christmas
