= Chupacabra: Dark Seas =

2005 American film

- DVD cover
- Also known as: Chupacabra Terror
- Written by: Steve Jankowski; John Shepphird
- Directed by: John Shepphird
- Starring: John Rhys-Davies; Giancarlo Esposito; Dylan Neal; Chelan Simmons
- Music by: Penka Kouneva
- Country of origin: United States
- Original language: English

Production
- Producers: Charles Arthur Berg; Paul Colichman; Steve Jankowski; Stephen P. Jarchow; Scott Putman; Jeffrey Schenck
- Cinematography: Neal Brown
- Editor: Lawrence A. Maddox
- Running time: 89 minutes

Original release
- Network: Sci Fi Channel
- Release: January 29, 2005

Chupacabra: Dark Seas (released on DVD as Chupacabra Terror) is a 2005 Syfy channel original film directed by John Shepphird and starring John Rhys-Davies, Giancarlo Esposito, Dylan Neal, and Chelan Simmons. It was filmed on location in the Turks and Caicos Islands.

== Plot ==
Dr. Peña (Esposito), a cryptozoologist, manages to capture El Chupacabra on a remote Caribbean island and smuggles it aboard the cruise ship Regent Queen, commanded by Captain Randolph (Rhys-Davies) with the assistance of his young daughter, and ship fitness instructor, Jenny (Simmons). The Regent Queen has been experiencing a rash of burglaries, and Federal Marshal Lance Thompson (Neal) is brought on board to investigate.

Unfortunately, crew members sneak into the cargo hold on their break; their curiosity getting the better of them, they accidentally unlock the shipping container holding the creature. It kills them and escapes into the ship. When bodies start turning up, all passengers are ordered back to their cabins. However, an old woman is trying to catch her Shih Tzu; she follows it into the casino, where she finds, to her horror, El Chupacabra devouring her dog. Seeing the woman a better meal, the beast attacks and eats her.

U.S. Navy Seals are called in to help stop the creature, but their efforts are hindered by Dr. Peña, who believes the creature's life is more valuable than the lives of those aboard. The Navy Seals are killed off one by one by the beast and Dr. Peña resorts to using Jenny as live bait to recapture El Chupacabra. However, he is foiled when the beast outsmarts and fatally wounds him. Jenny is saved by Lance and they meet up with her father, who has set the engines to explode as all the other passengers have been evacuated. They flee on a lifeboat moments before the ship blows up and sinks the ship, taking the beast with it. As the group watches the ship sink, Captain Randolph tells Jenny and Lance that he has decided to retire and write his memoirs.

== Cast ==
- John Rhys-Davies as Captain 'Daddy' Randolph
- Dylan Neal as Lance Thompson
- Chelan Simmons as Jenny Randolph
- Giancarlo Esposito as Dr. Peña
- Paula Shaw as Millie Hartman
- David Millbern as Rick McGraw
- Luke Darnell as Ensign Peters
- Mark Viniello as El Chupacabra

== Home media ==
The film was released on DVD by Columbia TriStar on May 3, 2005. It was later released by Sony Pictures Home Entertainment on July 3, 2016.

== Reception ==
Chupacabra: Dark Seas received mostly negative reviews upon its release, with many critics criticizing the film's acting, dialogue, and clichéd script. TV Guide panned the film, awarding it 1/4 stars criticizing the film's reliance on cheap thrills and parodistic laughs stating, "[though] the gore may satisfy die-hard monster mashers, but the cheesy-looking creature isn’t fit to touch the gills of the Creature from the Black Lagoon". Andrew Smith from Popcorn Pictures awarded the film a score of 3/10, writing, "Chupacabra: Dark Seas contains some alright moments but it’s not nearly enough to have to sit through yet another bargain basement creature feature from the Sci-Fi Channel. With an appalling script which goes through the motions from the opening scene right up until the end credits, even the decent make-up effects can’t save this mess." David Nusair from ReelFilm Reviews gave the film 2/4 stars, calling it "a mildly entertaining horror flick". In his review, Nusair criticized the film's dialogue, and clichéd story.

Scott Weinberg from DVD Talk called the film "hilarious" writing, "Every conceivable component of the movie - the comically amateurish acting performances, the head-slappingly stupid screenplay, the dry-as-paint directorial approach, the gore-soaked "guy in a rubber suit" monster, the goofball CGI cruise ship used in the various establishing shots—just screams of accidental entertainment."
