= Avalanche (1994 film) =

- Genre: Action; Thriller
- Written by: Tim Redman
- Directed by: Paul Shapiro
- Starring: Michael Gross; Deanna Milligan; Myles Ferguson; David Hasselhoff
- Theme music composer: Jonathan Goldsmith
- Country of origin: Canada
- Original language: English

Production
- Executive producers: Caldecot Chubb; Peter Sussman
- Producer: Jonathan Goodwill
- Cinematography: Alar Kivilo
- Editor: Michael Robison
- Running time: 100 minutes
- Production company: Atlantis Films

Original release
- Network: CTV Television Network
- Release: November 1, 1994

Avalanche is a 1994 made-for-television disaster action thriller film directed by Paul Shapiro and starring Michael Gross, Deanna Milligan, Myles Ferguson and David Hasselhoff. The film was shot in British Columbia, Canada.

== Premise ==
A father (Gross) and his two children (Milligan, Ferguson) take a trip up to a log cabin in the mountains. Duncan (Hasselhoff) is a diamonds smuggler who unintentionally crashes his plane causing an avalanche that traps the family inside their cabin. He is rescued by the family. While they are trying to dig their way out to freedom, he instead aggressively forces them to search for the diamonds he had smuggled from Russia.

== Critical reception ==
In his Variety review, critic Tony Scott called Avalanche "a solid thriller", highlighting the "stunning" camerawork, editing and the musical score. The Indianapolis News agreed that it was suspenseful; "for all its hokiness, the movie had me on the edge of my seat the whole time. That's beecause you never know what's coming next in this thriller". However, AllMovie's Bernadette McCallion was less enthusiastic and only gave the film 2 out of 5 stars.

== Cast ==
- Michael Gross as Brian Kemp
- Deanna Milligan as Deidre Kemp
- Myles Ferguson as Max Kemp
- David Hasselhoff as Duncan Snyder
- Don S. Davis as Whitney
- George Josef as Major
- Ben Cardinal as Hunter
