= Liar, Liar (1993 film) =

1993 Canadian television film

- Genre: Drama
- Written by: Nancy Isaak
- Directed by: Jorge Montesi
- Starring: Vanessa King; Art Hindle
- Theme music composer: Fred Mollin
- Country of origin: Canada
- Original language: English

Production
- Producer: Phil Savath
- Cinematography: Thomas Burstyn
- Editor: Allan Lee
- Running time: 90 min

Original release
- Network: CBC Television
- Release: January 24, 1993

Liar, Liar is a 1993 Canadian drama television film starring Vanessa King as a girl who accuses her father (Art Hindle) of molestation, only to have no one in her family believe her because of her history of telling tall tales and bullying. The film originally aired on Sunday, January 24, 1993 on CBC Television in Canada.

It aired under the title Liar, Liar: Between Father and Daughter on CBS on Tuesday, June 22, 1993 in the United States. It was also released under the title Daddy's Little Secret in the United Kingdom.

== Plot ==
Kelly Farrow is an 11-year-old girl with a history of telling tall tales and bullying her younger siblings. One night, she locks her 6-year-old brother Patrick in the bathroom, which terrifies him greatly, and is punished by her father Gil, who supposedly "spanks" her. Afterwards, Kelly vows that she will never be hurt by him again. At school the next day, she hears a classmate tell a story about a relative who accused her father of molestation and had him sent to jail; this gives her an idea. Kelly tells her teacher Mrs. Hildebrant that her father has been sexually abusing her. Kelly speaks with the authorities, and they arrange to have her father arrested.

The accusation and subsequent trial creates distance between Kelly and her family; mother Mary and sisters Jean "Nini" and Christina "Chrissy" doubt Kelly, given her history of lying and bullying. The only family member who believes her is Patrick. Gil's attorney Helen Browne picks her case apart in court by confirming that Kelly is technically still a virgin (as her hymen has not been broken), and by casting doubt on the medical evidence of abuse. People come to believe that Kelly is lying because her father is known to be strict in his punishments, including prosecutor Susan Miori, and she struggles to get people to believe her.

When older sister Chrissy tries to talk Kelly into dropping the case, Kelly confronts her with her knowledge of a secret that Chrissy herself has completely repressed her memories. Throughout her childhood and adolescence, Gil abused her and made her promise not to tell anyone (or her mother Mary), and switched his incestuous attentions to Kelly after Chrissy left home. As they are talking, Patrick becomes hysterically frightened after being left alone in the bathroom with Chrissy's husband Keith Berezuk. Shell-shocked, Chrissy realizes that not only was Kelly telling the truth, but that Patrick has also suffered at the hands of their father, which is where his fear of being locked in the bathroom stems from.

After confronting her father for lying to her over the years, Chrissy defends her sister by telling the court of her own abuse, which parallels Kelly's account. The next day, Gil is convicted and sentenced to prison for 10 months and probation for two years. The judge (including Susan Miori) apologizes to Kelly, stating that age is not a factor in determining honesty. He goes on to state that he wants a full investigation into Chrissy's allegations, and into Gil's relations with Nini and Patrick. While Mary and Nini are shocked and devastated at the situation, Kelly walks out with Chrissy, Keith and Patrick, relieved that she was finally believed and is now estranged from her father, her mother and Nini. The film ends with Chrissy apologizing to Kelly outside the courthouse for leaving her and not taking her with her in the first place while the abuse escalated, and the two share an emotional and loving embrace.

== Cast ==
- Art Hindle as Gil Farrow
- Vanessa King as Kelly Farrow
- Janne Mortil as Christina "Chrissy" Farrow-Berezuk
- Rosemary Dunsmore as Mary Farrow
- Ashleigh Aston Moore as Jean "Nini" Farrow
- Joel Palmer as Patrick Farrow
- Kate Nelligan as Susan Miori
- Roman Podhora as Keith Berezuk
- Michelle St. John as Janice
- Wendy Van Reisen as Mrs. Hildebrandt
- Kaj-Erik Eriksen as Jonah Collins
- Susan Hogan as Helen Browne
- Selina Hanuse as Female student

== Reception ==
Liar, Liar is known for its numerous Gemini Award nominations. The Los Angeles Times praised the film, with critic Ray Loynd noting that the film's candid flashbacks to traumatic childhood sexual abuse might be "unnerving", while also stating, "a Canadian production (which premiered in Canada on the CBC last January), the movie is perhaps the most candid and most suspenseful parent/child molestation story aired to date on U.S. television." Tony Scott of Daily Variety was slightly more critical but still generally positive, stating, "if the outcome's not entirely satisfactory, the telefilm has much to say about truth and buried anger."

== Award nominations ==
Year	Award	Category	Recipient	Result
1994	Gemini Award	Best Writing in a Dramatic Program or Mini-Series	Nancy Isaak	Nominated
1994	Gemini Award	Best TV Movie	Liar, Liar	Nominated
1994	Gemini Award	Best Performance by an Actress in a Leading Role in a Dramatic Program or Mini-Series	Vanessa King	Nominated
1994	Gemini Award	Best Performance by an Actor in a Leading Role in a Dramatic Program or Mini-Series	Art Hindle	Nominated
1994	Gemini Award	Best Original Music Score for a Program or Mini-Series	Fred Mollin	Nominated
1994	Gemini Award	Best Direction in a Dramatic Program or Mini-Series	Jorge Montesi	Nominated
