= Myles Ferguson =

Canadian actor (1981-2000)

- Born: Myles Steven Ferguson; January 3, 1981; North Vancouver, British Columbia, Canada
- Died: September 29, 2000 (aged 19); Vancouver, British Columbia, Canada
- Years active: 1994–2000

Myles Steven Ferguson (January 3, 1981 – September 29, 2000) was a Canadian actor.

== Biography ==
He was born in North Vancouver, British Columbia, the son of Mike and Karen Ferguson, and brother of Alexandra, Skylar, and Wylie Ferguson.

== Partial filmography ==
=== Television ===
- Avalanche (1994) - Max Kemp
- The Odyssey (2 episodes, 1994) - Bricks
- The Commish (1 episode, 1994) - Bobby MacGruder
- Are You Afraid of the Dark? (1 episode, 1994) - Jimmy Preston
- Hawkeye (1 episode, 1995) - Young Hawkeye
- Little Criminals (1995) - Cory
- The Other Mother: A Moment of Truth Movie (1995) - Brett Schaeffer
- Highlander: The Series (2 episodes, 1994–1995) - Kenny
- Strange Luck (1 episode, 1995) - Urchin / Bike Thief
- For Hope (1996) - Skinny Kid
- Viper (1 episode, 1997) - Kyle Reese
- The Sentinel (1 episode, 1997) - Alec Summers
- The X-Files (2 episodes, 1995–1998) - Joey Agostino / Boy in the Bus
- Two of Hearts (1999)
- The Outer Limits (episode, "Stranded" 1999)
- Poltergeist: The Legacy (3 episodes, 1996–1999) - Young Derek Rayne
- Edgemont (13 episodes, 2000) - Scott Linton

=== Film ===
- Slam Dunk Ernest (1995) - Johnny
- Live TV (1996) - Jamie
- Air Bud: Golden Receiver (1998) - J.D.
- Question of Privilege (1999) - Ian Aldrige
- Snow Falling on Cedars (1999) - German Soldier
- MVP: Most Valuable Primate (2000) - Waterboy
- Spooky House (2000) - Mike The Mouth (final film role)

== Death ==
Ferguson died in a car accident at the age of 19 on September 29, 2000.
