= List of Edgemont episodes =

The following is a list of episodes for the CBC original television series, Edgemont. The series started on January 4, 2000, and concluded its fifth and final season on July 21, 2004.

== Series overview ==
Season	Episodes	Originally released	
Season	Episodes	First released	Last released
1	13	January 4, 2000	April 5, 2000
2	13	October 5, 2000	December 7, 2000
3	13	September 19, 2001	November 29, 2001
4	18	October 16, 2002	December 12, 2002
5	13	April 28, 2004	July 21, 2004

== Episodes ==
=== Season 1 (2000) ===
No. overall	No. in season	Title	Directed by	Written by	Original release date	Prod. code
1	1	"Collateral Damage"	Anthony Atkins	Ian Weir	January 4, 2000	101
In "Collateral Damage" Scott falls in love at the first sight of Laurel. Mark's brother runs away in response to their parents' impending divorce. And Anika decides to be Laurel's enemy over a perceived slight concerning her outfit.
2	2	"No Worries"	Anthony Atkins	Dennis Foon	January 11, 2000	102
Kat and Mark try to find Travis, their missing younger brother. Scott attempts to ask out Laurel. Anika spreads rumours about Laurel. Mark and Laurel meet for the first time. Jen finds Travis, Mark's little brother sleeping in her car. Gil accidentally insults Chris. Erin spies Mark and Laurel having coffee together. Kat busts Mark on his e-mail from Laurel.
3	3	"On the Edge"	Anthony Atkins	Joan MacLeod, Ian Weir	January 18, 2000	103
Mark and Jen have been together six months, and she plans on having sex with him. When Mark and Laurel are spotted hanging out, Anika and Erin spread rumors about them which hurts Jen and leads Scott feeling betrayed. Laurel apologizes to Jen and confronts Anika and Erin, making them hate her even more. Laurel and Shannon meet. Scott gets drunk and embarrasses himself in front of Laurel. Jen and Mark have a romantic anniversary but she feels she's not ready to sleep with Mark, but Mark says that it's fine. Later that night Cat spies Mark exchanging emails with Laurel.
4	4	"Just Friends"	Anthony Atkins	Ian Weir	January 25, 2000	104
Mark misleads Jen while falling for Laurel. Scott meets Brenda, the girl of his dreams. Cat reveals to Jen that Mark has been emailing and talking with Laurel behind her back. Erin pines over Chris, who's more interested in Anika. Jen reads Mark and Laurel's emails.
5	5	"Deal with the Devil"	Jane Thompson	Joan MacLeod, Ian Weir	February 2, 2000	105
Things get steamy when Mark poses for Laurel's photo shoot and the two share an illicit kiss. When Erin attempts to dissuade Chris's interest in Anika by saying she is having a steamy affair with a grade 12 guy, it only intrigues Chris more. Chris wagers against Gil that Anika will have sex with him. Scott pursues Brenda and upon discovering she's religious decides to become a Druid. Jen becomes increasingly more suspicious of Mark and Laurel and for good reason too.
6	6	"Lover's Leap"	Jane Thompson	Dennis Foon	February 8, 2000	106
After their illicit kiss, Laurel tells Mark she can't be with him when he's still with Jen. Mark tells Laurel he will break up with Jen. While feeling she may be losing Mark, Jen contemplates having sex with him in order to keep him. Scott throws an Equinox party. Craig leads a one-man protest at the Cafe Java but when he chains himself to the table and insults Maggie, she leaves him there overnight. When Anika hears the "torrid affair" rumours going around about her, Erin tells her it was Laurel who started them (when really it was a jealous Erin). Laurel and Jen work uncomfortably on a school project together. Mark goes over to Jen's to end things with her but they end up having sex. When Mark falls asleep, Jen is left looking very unsure of herself.
7	7	"The Liar's Club"	Jane Thompson	Ian Weir	February 15, 2000	107
Mark and Jen deal with the aftermath of their night together. Scott wonders if Brenda really likes him. Chris vehemently pursues Anika in order to fulfill his bet with Gil. Craig tries to live down "his little accident" at Captain Java's. Mark strings Laurel along as he tries to come to grips with his feelings for Jen. Laurel's photo of a shirtless Mark gets passed around the school. A hurt Jen "subtly" mentions her budding sex life with Mark to Laurel. Shannon warns Mark of the repercussions of his situation. Chris and Anika have a date where he tries to go too far. Shannon and Jen have a fight over Mark.
8	8	"Truth or Consequences"	Jane Thompson	Susin Nielsen	February 22, 2000	108
Anika completely blows off Chris. Shannon attempts to mend fences with Jen. Erin tries to get to the bottom of the Chris and Anika incident. Scott is impressed by Brenda's embracing of his "religion" and tries to live up to her expectations. Erin, in an attempt to sway Chris's interest in Anika, tells him Anika is a virgin. Unfortunately for Erin, this only makes Gil and Chris's bet rise. Laurel ends things with Mark for good. When Mark learns his dad is cheating on his mom again and has left, this encourages him to solidify things with Jen.
9	9	"The Frog Prince"	Gary Harvey	Dennis Foon	March 8, 2000	109
Brenda and Scott go on their first real date...to her church youth group. Mark and Jen's sex life becomes the talk of the school when Shannon mistakenly mentions something to Craig, while his sister Erin is nearby. Craig tells Laurel about his endangered frog project. Chris apologizes to Anika, who softens towards him, but is completely unaware of his bet with Gil, unlike Erin who reveals to Chris that she knows. Mark attempts to mend his friendship with Laurel but is shot down. Mark and Jen try to determine who told about their love life and Jen falsely accuses Laurel when it was really Shannon, Jen's best friend.
10	10	"Revelations"	Gary Harvey	Dennis Foon, Ian Weir	March 15, 2000	110
Erin and Chris go out on a date, but to Erin's disappointment, all Chris really wants is Anika. Laurel tells Jen about her and Mark which causes Jen and Mark to argue about Laurel. Scott asks out Brenda. Craig and Laurel work on a Save the Frogs campaign.
11	11	"What the False Heart Knows"	Gary Harvey	Laurie Finstad Knizhnik	March 22, 2000	111
Anika and Chris go out on a date. Scott buys Brenda underwear but rethinks it before he gives it to her. Mark tries to make up with Jen. Mark, Kat and Travis try to cope with their parents' impending divorce. Chris tells Erin to back off when she continues to come on to him.
12	12	"This Song's for You"	Gary Harvey	Joan MacLeod	March 30, 2000	112
Mark tells Jen the whole truth about him and Laurel. Anika learns about the bet that Chris and Gil have going on her. Erin is once again rejected by Chris. Anika and Erin declare war on Chris after they mend their friendship. After Chris's rejection Erin is led straight into the waiting arms of Gil.
13	13	"New Beginnings"	Gary Harvey	Susin Nielsen, Ian Weir	April 5, 2000	113
Jen breaks up with Mark. Erin blows off Gil after their makeout session. Chris spreads rumours about Anika as does Gil about Erin. Kat distributes teacher evaluations. Shannon and Laurel decide to be friends. Jen's brother Derek gets arrested. Scott wants to change his relationship with Brenda.

=== Season 2 (2000) ===
No. overall	No. in season	Title	Directed by	Written by	Original release date	Prod. code
14	1	"Matchmaker, Matchmaker"	Anthony Atkins	Ian Weir	October 5, 2000	201
Anika tries to rekindle Mark and Laurel's romance. Kat gets expelled from school and Jennifer considers getting back together with Mark.
15	2	"The Web"	Anthony Atkins	Stacey Kaser	October 12, 2000	202
Craig organizes a rally to support Kat's cause. Erin and Anika befriend the new girl Kelsey, who also happens to be Chris's little sister.
16	3	"Brothers and Sisters"	Anthony Atkins	Susin Nielsen	October 19, 2000	203
Erin and Anika revel in the attention their website is getting, while denying to Chris that it's their doing. Laurel tries to decide whether to end things with Mark. Jen worries about her brother's court date. Craig continues to support Kat, while she develops a crush on him.
17	4	"Secrets and Lies"	Anthony Atkins	Stacey Kaser	November 8, 2000	204
Jennifer walks in on Laurel and Mark during an intimate moment. Erin and Anika get into trouble because of their Web site about Chris. Craig has a difficult time cancelling his date with Kat.
18	5	"Salt in the Wound"	E. Jane Thompson	Susin Nielsen	November 9, 2000	205
Jennifer tries to set up Shannon and Jordan. Mark learns some shocking news about Laurel's past. Derek's community-service work at the school takes a bad turn.
19	6	"Shall We Dance?"	E. Jane Thompson	Ian Weir	November 15, 2000	206
Jen decides to go to the school dance solo - and winds up having one of the worst nights of her life. Things between Mark and Laurel are still tense after his discovery that she went out with a twenty-year-old. Anika tries on a kinder, gentler image. Shannon and Craig make the mutual discovery that they like each other. Gil discovers he really is a sleazeball.
20	7	"Fight or Flight"	E. Jane Thompson	Stacey Kaser, Ian Weir	November 16, 2000	207
Mark finds himself in a difficult dilemma when he discovers Laurel is leaving Vancouver, British Columbia. Erin finds out Kevin has feelings for someone else. Derek gets himself into even more trouble after being provoked by Chris.
21	8	"Out of Control"	Anthony Atkins	Susin Nielsen	November 22, 2000	208
Laurel and Mark argue over how her video should conclude. Craig and Shannon are nervous about their on-screen kiss. Kevin is pleasantly surprised when he lands himself a date with both Erin and Brenda.
22	9	"Smoke and Mirrors"	Anthony Atkins	Joan MacLeod	November 23, 2000	209
Mark finds a bottle of vodka in the rec room. Erin tries to ruin Kevin's date with Brenda. Anika helps improve Chris's public image.
23	10	"Razor's Edge"	Anthony Atkins	Sara Graefe, Ian Weir	November 29, 2000	210
Kat makes plans for a weekend trip with Kurt. Shannon and Craig decide to end their relationship. Kevin tries to find out why Erin and Brenda are angry with him.
24	11	"Dead Men Walking"	Fred Frame	Ian Weir	November 30, 2000	211
Mark and Laurel are surprised when they discover Laurel is leaving earlier than expected. Gil and Kevin fight over Erin. Jen learns Shannon is confused about her sexual identity.
25	12	"Push Comes to Shove"	Fred Frame	Susin Nielsen, Sara Snow	December 6, 2000	212
While Jennifer and Shannon try to figure out Anika's campaign strategy, Anika and Chris attempt to come up with a plan to use Shannon's poem against her. Mark and Laurel discuss their future.
26	13	"Freefall"	Fred Frame	Ian Weir	December 7, 2000	213
While the election results are announced pitting Anika against Shannon, Laurel and Mark meet for the very last time but things don't go quite as planned.

=== Season 3 (2001) ===
No. overall	No. in season	Title	Directed by	Written by	Original release date	Prod. code
27	1	"Dream On"	Anthony Atkins	Ian Weir	September 19, 2001	301
Laurel and Mark decide to live together when Laurel announces she's staying in Edgemont without her parents. Meanwhile, Jennifer tries to persuade Shannon to challenge Anika's presidency and Kevin asks Craig for advice on winning Erin's heart.
28	2	"The Birthday Boy"	Anthony Atkins	Ian Weir	September 26, 2001	302
A family crisis causes Mark and Laurel to put off their plans to move in together. Meanwhile, Anika starts a food bank campaign to disprove claims that she's shallow and Chris becomes even more infatuated with Jennifer.
29	3	"Kurvers' List"	Anthony Atkins	Joan MacLeod	October 3, 2001	303
Gil posts a list of the "hottest" girls at his school on the Internet, which could jeopardize Kevin & Erin's growing courtship. Meanwhile, Laurel becomes increasingly stressed about finding a place of her own to live, and Anika enlists Bekka's help to petition against Jennifer's newspaper editorials.
30	4	"Winners and Losers"	Anthony Atkins	Sara Snow	October 10, 2001	304
Anika decides to get back at Jennifer for refusing to write a glowing editorial for her. Meanwhile, Laurel and Mark make up, and Erin and Kevin become a couple.
31	5	"The Paper Chase"	Frank Glassen	Susin Nielsen	October 17, 2001	305
Kat decides to move back home and clashes with Laurel. Meanwhile, Maggie is on a search for a roommate, Anika is accused of plagiarism and sells out Erin, in order to save herself, and Chris and Jen get closer.
32	6	"Show and Tell"	Tom Braidwood	Sara Graefe	October 24, 2001	306
Laurel becomes upset when Mark's friends ruin her plans for a romantic dinner. Meanwhile, Jen and Chris's relationship is put to the test when Derek returns from jail, and Shannon helps Craig with a benefit concert.
33	7	"Squaring the Circle"	Tom Braidwood	Ian Weir	October 31, 2001	307
Laurel worries that Mark's new job will keep them apart. Meanwhile, Jen asks Chris to apologize to Derek and Anika is impeached after helping Craig with a project.
34	8	"Goodbye Cruel World"	Anthony Atkins	Stacey Kaser	November 7, 2001	308
Craig realizes he has feelings for Anika after finding out that she plans to transfer to another school. Meanwhile, Laurel becomes upset when Josh sharply criticizes her film.
35	9	"Friday Night's All Right"	Anthony Atkins	Joan MacLeod	November 14, 2001	309
Jennifer and Shannon get into a heated argument at Laurel's slumber party. Meanwhile, Kat finds out her anonymous online friend lives nearby, and Kevin becomes upset when he sees Erin flirting with Mark.
36	10	"Showdown"	Anthony Atkins	Ian Weir	November 21, 2001	310
Derek's temper frightens Laurel after he loses his job. Meanwhile, Kat finds out the identity of her long-term Internet correspondent, Demonslayer, and Josh tells Laurel how he feels about her.
37	11	"This One's for You"	Bill Gereghty	Stacey Kaser	November 22, 2001	311
Craig tries to steal the limelight from Anika when she plans a special video screening, but it only ends up bringing them closer. Meanwhile, Laurel finds out Mark is failing at school, Kat tries to avoid Gil, and Chris woos Jen with opera tickets.
38	12	"Are You With Me or Not?"	Bill Gereghty	Sara Graefe, Sara Snow	November 28, 2001	312
An angry Mark discovers Josh knows about his problems at school. Meanwhile, Laurel's video diary falls into the wrong hands, and Anika is hurt when she finds out Craig doesn't like his makeover.
39	13	"The Cold Light of Dawn"	Bill Gereghty	Ian Weir	November 29, 2001	313
Mark and Laurel's relationship is put to the test after Mark sees Laurel's video diary. Meanwhile, Anika and Erin get into a fight over Craig.

=== Season 4 (2002) ===
No. overall	No. in season	Title	Directed by	Written by	Original release date	Prod. code
40	1	"The Homecoming"	Tom Braidwood	Ian Weir	October 16, 2002	401
Mark anxiously awaits Laurel's return from Houston, and Jennifer learns Shannon is no longer living at home because she came out to her parents. Meanwhile, Mitch, a new student at McKinley, ruffles Anika's feathers when he bullies her cousin.
41	2	"Moving On"	Tom Braidwood	Sara Graefe	October 17, 2002	402
Craig breaks up with Anika and Mark's French lessons grow tense when Laurel becomes his tutor. Meanwhile, a homeless Shannon moves in with Jennifer.
42	3	"Do You Mean What You Say?"	Tom Braidwood	Stacey Kaser	October 23, 2002	403
Laurel becomes jealous when Mark and Tracey work together at a school car wash. Meanwhile, when Kat agrees to go on a date with Gil, he soon learns she has an ulterior motive and Jen & Chris hit a snag in their relationship.
43	4	"You Gotta Have Friends"	Tom Braidwood	Ian Weir	October 24, 2002	404
Erin's attempts to sabotage Laurel's and Mark's relationship has dire consequences for her. Meanwhile, Gil thwarts Bekka's attempt to ask out Kevin, and Craig attempts to thwart "the man".
44	5	"Talk of the Town"	Anthony Atkins	James Phillips	October 30, 2002	405
A shocked Jennifer discovers the reason why she's been feeling sick. Meanwhile, Craig and Kat debate on the school radio, and Kevin applies for a job at the warehouse, in order to make money to take out Bekka.
45	6	"Two Guys and a Baby"	Anthony Atkins	Jennifer Cowan	October 31, 2002	406
Mark is shocked when Paige arrives for work with her baby. Meanwhile, at Chris's 18th birthday, Jennifer grapples with how to tell him about her pregnancy and Bekka decides to teach Gil a lesson when he interferes in her & Kevin's relationship.
46	7	"A Simple Plan"	Anthony Atkins	Susin Nielsen	November 6, 2002	407
Craig and Shannon call Gil's bluff on a dare, but their plans to rig the outcome are thwarted by an interfering Anika. Meanwhile, Mark encourages Paige to go back to school and Jen & Chris find themselves at a crossroads about their situation.
47	8	"Braving the Lions"	Frank Glassen	Sara Snow	November 7, 2002	408
Paige goes back to school as a single mom and Craig & Anika's relationship starts to deteriorate. Meanwhile, Shannon and Craig are let off the hook to streak, only to be coerced into modeling lingerie in Anika's fashion show and Gil tries to use Paige's baby as a 'chick magnet'.
48	9	"The Dress"	Bill Gereghty	Ian Weir	November 13, 2002	409
Craig develops erotic fantasies about Shelby when he sees her in the dress Anika designed, and Chris finally learns about Jen's secret. Meanwhile, Paige is flattered when Mark shows interest in her love life and Wayne angers Mitch and is left stranded in the school hallway...naked.
49	10	"Fool for Love"	Bill Gereghty	Ian Weir	November 14, 2002	410
Jen tries to decide what to do about her pregnancy and Chris, having discovered Jen's secret, takes off for Seattle to clear his head. Meanwhile, Anika's fashion show is disrupted when Craig declares his passion to Shelby in his boxer shorts, Mitch and Travis pay the price for their prank, and Mark and Paige connect over their brothers' situation.
50	11	"Afterburn"	Bill Gereghty	Stacey Kaser	November 20, 2002	411
Gil gets into trouble over the source material for his play, and Craig is ignored by the women of A.C. McKinley. Meanwhile, Jennifer continues to cope with her pregnancy.
51	12	"True Colours"	Anthony Atkins	Joan MacLeod	November 21, 2002	412
Jennifer decides to have her baby, instead of getting an abortion. Meanwhile, Laurel warns Mark about going out with Paige, while also being a source of titilation for Gil when she takes a role in his play.
52	13	"The Artist"	Anthony Atkins	Sara Snow	November 27, 2002	413
Gil learns he was wrong to think Laurel had feelings for him and Mark tells Paige why he bailed out of their potential date. Meanwhile, Chris starts to scrutinize Jen's eating habits.
53	14	"Out and About"	Anthony Atkins	Jennifer Cowan	November 28, 2002	414
Shannon comes out of the closet, causing Maggie to have second thoughts about her roommate. Meanwhile, Mark and Paige go out on a real date, Wayne's locker is vandalized with homophobic graffiti, and Erin sets her sights on Josh.
54	15	"The Date"	Anthony Atkins	Joan MacLeod	December 4, 2002	415
Mark and Paige run into trouble planning their first date, and Erin is ecstatic when she thinks that Derek has feelings for her. Meanwhile, Shannon worries how Maggie will feel when she brings someone home.
55	16	"The Girl on the Moon"	Gary Harvey	Stacey Kaser	December 5, 2002	416
Anika hijacks Laurel's part in Gil's play, portraying Erin as sex-starved vixen. Meanwhile, Paige and Mark try to regain their jobs after Tyler fires them from the warehouse, and after watching the play, Derek reconsiders a relationship with Erin.
56	17	"Walking Wounded"	Gary Harvey	Sara Graefe	December 11, 2002	417
Gil tries to make amends with Erin and Kevin loses it when Bekka dumps him for Travis. Meanwhile, Jennifer has a health scare and Laurel gets offered a six-month modeling gig in Japan.
57	18	"Two Minutes to Midnight"	Gary Harvey	Stacey Kaser	December 12, 2002	418
Mark and Laurel reconcile, and he insists that she take the job in Japan. Meanwhile, Gil is heartbroken when Kevin escorts Erin to the dance, prompting Erin to realize that Gil truly cares, and Chris proposes to Jennifer.

=== Season 5 (2004) ===
No. overall	No. in season	Title	Directed by	Written by	Original release date	Prod. code
58	1	"Ain't Nobody's Fault But Mine"	Anthony Atkins	Ian Weir	April 28, 2004	501
While Laurel is away in Japan, Mark rents her room in Maggie's apartment. Meanwhile, Jen and Chris attempt to continue their relationship when their pregnancy takes an unexpected turn and Gil is in hot water when Erin catches him with another girl.
59	2	"Things Change"	Anthony Atkins	Elizabeth Stewart	May 5, 2004	502
Jen's new musical interest and friends come between her and Chris. Meanwhile, Gil tries desperately to make up with Erin, Mark has his hands full with his brother Travis and with Laurel's return.
60	3	"Coffee, Tea, or Me?"	Anthony Atkins	Sara Graefe	May 12, 2004	503
Laurel starts working at the coffee shop with Maggie, but with disastrous results. Meanwhile, Jen finds out she isn't able to carry a child to term, and the news drives her further away from Chris, Gil & Erin make up when she learns his play is being turned into a film and Kevin has issues with how Tracy sees him.
61	4	"Get a Job"	Anthony Atkins	Joan MacLeod	May 19, 2004	504
Mark considers a job offer that would cause him to quit school. Meanwhile, Anika & Craig compete for a job at the warehouse, things continue to go downhill for Chris & Jen, and Gil & Kevin attempt to avoid their girlfriends' wrath.
62	5	"Never Play Poker with a Man Named Doc"	Bill Gereghty	Ian Weir	May 26, 2004	505
Mark hosts a poker game for all the guys with high-stakes results. Meanwhile, Jen continues to drive Chris further away and keeps her budding musical interests apart from him; Craig attempts to deal with Anika and the damage she caused to Tyler's car.
63	6	"Aptitudes"	Bill Gereghty	Elizabeth Stewart	June 2, 2004	506
Tyler & Anika play an extortion-filled version of cat and mouse, that leaves Craig the victim. Meanwhile aptitude test results affect many, including Mark who's aptitude for art leads him into taking the starring role in Gil's play; and Chris & Jen face an ultimatum.
64	7	"Can't Buy Me Love"	Bill Gereghty	Joan MacLeod	June 9, 2004	507
When Laurel's modeling money comes through, she's inundated with people and their ideas for her money – including Mark; Gil desperately tries to fire Erin from his movie; Shannon misunderstands when her friend Stevie asks her to a dance; and Chris & Jen attempt to deal with post-breakup issues.
65	8	"That Old Black Magic"	Frank Glassen	Ian Weir, Tara Gereaux	June 16, 2004	508
Filming begins on Gil's movie with distrastrous results: Becca continues to fawn all over Mark, jeopardizing her relationship with Travis, and Gil & Erin get into a fight when she takes a love scene with Mark too far. Meanwhile, Shannon finds it difficult to continue being friends with Stevie, when she rebuffs her romantic intentions.
66	9	"Come On Home to My Place"	Gary Harvey	Sara Graefe	June 23, 2004	509
Jen's brother Derek, returns to town and manages to play knight in shining armour and rescue Anika; Laurel & Mark clash at their apartment after their unofficial breakup; Shannon and Stevie make plans now that they're a couple; Mark attempts to tutor Travis when he learns he's failing math, but once again Bekka interferes.
67	10	"Lines in the Sand"	Gary Harvey	Elizabeth Stewart	June 30, 2004	510
Laurel begins looking for a place of her own, when Maggie & Mark make it clear their apartment is too crowded; Shannon's up in arms when the principal won't let her talk about her being a lesbian on Tracey's radio show, but her actions may cause her to lose Stevie; Anika learns more about Derek; Derek disapproves of Jen's friendship with Eddie, as Eddie prepares to move on.
68	11	"Moving Day"	Gary Harvey	Ian Weir	July 7, 2004	511
Jen contemplates leaving with Eddie; Shannon attempts to patch things up with Stevie, after outing her to her parents; Gil continues planning his grad stunt; Chris & Mark help Laurel move with disastrous results; Wayne finds his soulmate.
69	12	"The Morning After the Night Before"	Anthony Atkins	Ian Weir	July 14, 2004 July 21, 2004	512
70	13	"The Morning After the Night Before"	Anthony Atkins	Ian Weir	July 14, 2004 July 21, 2004	513
Laurel & Mark bask in the afterglow of their first night together, but old problems attempt to creep up on them; Gil's Cancun grad stunt plans become a little richer; Jen learns some hard truths from Eddie's girlfriend; Derek pitches an investment deal to Anika; when faced with more trouble with Wayne's parents, Travis takes off. Everyone assumes the worst, when Gil vows revenge against Anika, and the grad money goes missing; Laurel & Mark make plans for their future; Jen & Chris are driven further apart when she reveals she was more than just friends with Eddie; Stevie returns to patch things up with Shannon; A.J. teaches Wayne how to live a little; Travis gets into some big trouble and Mark attempts to help him.
