= Richard Kahan =

Canadian television actor and writer (born 1980)

- Occupations: Actor, writer
- Years active: 1998–present

Richard Kahan is a Canadian television actor and writer. He is known for his role as Marco Pacella in the television series The 4400 and for his role as Gil Kurvers on the Canadian television series teen soap Edgemont.

== Film ==
Year	Title	Role	Notes
1998	Hand	Brother	
1999	Exiles	Frasier	
2002	Heart of America	Male Student	
2004	A Fortune in Frozen Dim Sum	Cute Guy	Short
2005	After Tomorrow	Tracy	
2006	The Sparkle Lite Motel	George McKinnon	Short
2008	Stuicide	Stu	Short

== Television ==
Year	Title	Role	Notes
2001–05	Edgemont	Gil Kurvers	Main role
2004	Da Vinci's Inquest	John Dunne	Recurring role
2004–07	The 4400	Marco Pacella	Recurring role
2005	The Colt	Silsbee	TV film
2005	Behind the Camera: The Unauthorized Story of Mork & Mindy	Alan Davis	TV film
2005	Stargate Atlantis	Baldric	"The Tower"
2005	Smallville	Bitterman	"Thirst"
2006	Reunion	Brian	"1996"
2006	Masters of Horror	David	"Sounds Like"
2007	Supernatural	Clerk	"Born Under a Bad Sign"
2007	Smallville	Brennan	"Noir"
2008	Eureka	Derek Bowers	"What About Bob?"
2009	Crash	Malcolm Sloan	"Alone Again Or...", "Los Angeles"
2010	The Mentalist	Jeff Sparhawk	"Redline"
2013	Grey's Anatomy	Stuart Loeb	"Things We Said Today"

== Other works ==
Year	Title	Notes
2014-15	Outlander	Writers' & Ira Steven Behr's assistant, 16 episodes
2015	Silent War	Short, producer
2016	Outlander	Writer, "Untimely Resurrection"
2016	Outlander	Writers' assistant, 13 episodes
2017	Lucky	Producer,
