= Dominic Zamprogna =

Canadian actor (born 1979)

- Born: April 21, 1979 (age 47); Hamilton, Ontario, Canada
- Occupation: Actor
- Years active: 1991–present
- Spouse: Linda Leslie (m. 2009)
- Children: 3
- Relatives: Gema Zamprogna (sister)

Dominic Zamprogna (/zæmˈprɒɡnə/, Italian: [dzamˈproɲɲa]; born April 21, 1979) is a Canadian television actor and voice artist. He is perhaps best known for his roles on the television series Edgemont, Battlestar Galactica and General Hospital.

== Early life ==
Zamprogna was born in Hamilton, Ontario, Canada. His parents operated a dance school and his father, Lou Zamprogna, was a dancer, choreographer, and ran an acting school at Theatre Aquarius. Zamprogna is the brother of Gema Zamprogna and twin of Amanda Zamprogna (both are actresses). He is of Italian descent.

As a child, Dominic enjoyed soccer and basketball and wanted to become a small athlete. He had some roles as a child actor, including F/X2 and the popular series Are You Afraid of the Dark?, in which he played Rush in "The Tale of Cutter's Treasure Part 1 and Part 2" and Jed in "The Tale of the Full Moon".

He attended the University of Toronto briefly, but left, later noting "I was no good at school work."

== Career ==
In 1996, at the age of 17, Zamprogna appeared in the movie The Boys Club. In 2000, he was cast as Mark Deosdade, one of the lead roles in the Canadian teen drama series Edgemont; Zamprogna went on to appear in every episode of Edgemont's five seasons. Zamprogna also appeared in nine episodes of Battlestar Galactica, as well as in several films.

In 2009, Zamprogna joined the cast of ABC's daytime soap opera General Hospital as Dante Falconeri. For his role, Zamprogna received a Daytime Emmy Award nomination for outstanding supporting actor in 2014. In June 2018, he confirmed he was exiting the soap and had filmed his last scenes. He made a couple brief returns to the soap, first in November 2018, and again in March 2019. In May 2020, he expressed a desire to return to General Hospital, even to the point of signing a contract if one is offered. In July of the same year, it was announced that Zamprogna would return to the role, making his first re-appearance on August 3, 2020.

== Personal life ==
On November 1, 2009, Zamprogna married his longtime girlfriend, Linda Leslie, in Los Angeles. His wife gave birth to their daughter, Anbilliene, on October 19, 2010. They welcomed their second daughter, Eliana, on December 30, 2012. Their third daughter, Adeline Pauline, was born on May 17, 2015.

== Filmography ==
=== Film ===
Year	Title	Role	Notes
1991	F/X2	Chris Brandon	
1995	Iron Eagle on the Attack	Rudy Marlowe	
1996	The Boys Club	Kyle	
2002	Drummer Boy	Philip Renold	
2005	It Waits	Justin Rawley	
2008	Cutting for Stone	Phillip	
2009	2012	Paramedic	

=== Television ===
Year	Title	Role	Notes
1991	Counterstrike	Terry	Episode: "Hide and Seek"
1992	Wojeck: Out of the Fire	Jesus Arcadio	TV movie
1992	The Trial of Red Riding Hood		TV movie
1993	Tales from the Cryptkeeper	Peter	Episode: "Cave Man"
1993	Are You Afraid of the Dark?	Jed	Episode: "The Tale of the Full Moon"
1994	Are You Afraid of the Dark?	Rush Keegan	Episode: "The Tale of Cutter's Treasure: Part 1"; Episode: "The Tale of Cutter's Treasure: Part 2"
1994	The Magic School Bus	Caller (voice)	Episode: "All Dried Up"
1994–1997	Kung Fu: The Legend Continues	Matt	Episode: "May I Ride with You" (1994); Episode: "May I Walk with You" (1995); Episode: "May I Talk with You" (1997)
1995	The NeverEnding Story	Atreyu (voice)	2 episodes
1995	Flight for Justice: The Nancy Conn Story	Billy	TV movie
1996	Ready or Not	Cam	Episode: "I Do, I Don't"
1996–1997	Wind at My Back	Tony Piretti	Episode: "A Family of Independent Means" (1996); Episode: "Moving Mountains" (1997)
1997	The Book of Jamie G.	Jamie G	TV movie
1999	Psi Factor: Chronicles of the Paranormal	Kevin	Episode: "Solitary Confinement"
2000	The Stalking of Laurie Show	Andrew	TV movie
2001	Almost America	Older Matteo	
2001	Dying to Dance	Zack	TV movie
2001	MythQuest	Kadilus	Episode: "The Minotaur"
2001	Leap Years	Hector	Episode: "1.8"
2001	Danger Beneath the Sea	AS Ryan Alford	TV movie
2001–2005	Edgemont	Mark Deosdade	Main role
2002	Odyssey 5	Justin Deckard	Episode: "Rapture"
2003	Da Vinci's Inquest	Police Constable #1	Episode: "The Ducks Are Too Depressing"; Episode: "Twenty Five Dollar Conversation"
2004	Touching Evil	LaMarr	Episode: "Memorial"
2004	Meltdown	Agent Steve Ritchie	TV movie
2004	Stargate Atlantis	Aries	Episode: "Childhood's End"
2004	Cold Squad	Mark	Episode: "Girlfriend in a Closet"
2004–2006	Battlestar Galactica	James "Jammer" Lyman	10 episodes
2005	Tru Calling	Donald Stuart Mitchell III	Episode: "Grace"
2005	Bloodsuckers	Damian	TV movie
2005	The Engagement Ring	Young Johnny	TV movie
2006	Supernatural	Beau	Episode: "Dead Man's Blood"
2006	Engaged to Kill	Nick Morgan / Ivan / Patrick Stiles	TV movie
2006	Deadly Skies	Hockstetter	TV movie
2006	Blade: The Series	Kurt	Episode: "Hunters"
2006	Battlestar Galactica: The Resistance	James "Jammer" Lyman	9 episodes
2007	A Valentine Carol	Ben	TV movie
2007	Painkiller Jane	Phil	Episode: "Playback"
2007	Bionic Woman	Med-Flight Tech #1	Episode: "Pilot"
2007	Flash Gordon	Rake	Episode: "Sorrow"
2008	The Border	Roberto Abrantes	Episode: "Normalizing Relations"
2008	The L Word	Greg / Jim	6 episodes
2009	Smallville	Bruno Mannheim	Episode: "Stiletto"
2009	Hostile Makeover	Tate	TV movie
2009	Stargate Universe	Dr. Boone	Episode: "Light"; Episode: "Life"
2009–present	General Hospital	Dante Falconeri	Main role
2019	Tin Star	Estuardo	4 episodes
2022	NCIS: Los Angeles	Paul Figueiredo	Episode: "Of Value"

== Awards and nominations ==
Year	Award	Category	Work	Result	Ref.
2005	Leo Award	Best Performance — Youth or Children's Program or Series	Edgemont	Nominated	
2014	Daytime Emmy Award	Outstanding Supporting Actor in a Drama Series	General Hospital	Nominated	
2016	Daytime Emmy Award	Outstanding Supporting Actor in a Drama Series	General Hospital	Nominated	
2019	Daytime Emmy Award	Outstanding Supporting Actor in a Drama Series	General Hospital	Nominated	
2021	Daytime Emmy Award	Outstanding Lead Actor in a Drama Series	General Hospital	Nominated	
2025	Daytime Emmy Award	Outstanding Lead Actor in a Drama Series	General Hospital	Nominated	
