= Vanessa King =

Canadian actress

- Born: September 19, 1980 (age 45); Coquitlam, British Columbia
- Occupation: Actress
- Years active: 1993–2005

Vanessa King (born September 19, 1980) is a Canadian former actress from Coquitlam, British Columbia, known for her role as Anika in the television series Edgemont, a role for which she was nominated in the category Best Performance in a Children's or Youth Program or Series for the Gemini Awards in 2001, a Leo Awards 'Best Performance' nomination in 2002 and a Leo Awards win in 2003.

== Recognition ==
As an eleven-year-old actress, previously having acted only in two commercials, she received acclaim for her starring role in the 1993 TV movie Liar, Liar, including a Gemini Award nomination in the category Best Performance by an Actress in a Leading Role in a Dramatic Program or Mini-series. She plays a troubled girl who accuses her father of sexually abusing her. Tom Barrett of The Vancouver Sun wrote that King's performance "is remarkable, showing a poise and subtlety beyond the range of most child actors." Critic Ray Loynd of the Los Angeles Times wrote that the role was "very well played ... in a believably spiteful, hateful way". John Haslett Cuff of The Globe and Mail wrote that she "so effectively captures the confusion and rebelliousness of the young girl that viewers' doubts about her story are genuine from the beginning." The Austin American-Statesman stated, "The acting is low-key and honest, with young King turning in a powerful performance as the enigmatic child." Critic Victor Dwyer, writing in Maclean's, said that King "does a convincing job as Kelley, portraying the young girl as equal parts crafty and oddly naive, her measured performance giving nothing away." The Toronto Star's TV critic, Greg Quill, called King's performance "a stunning debut".

== Filmography ==
=== Film ===
Year	Title	Role	Notes
1997	When Danger Follows You Home	Julie Werden	
1999	My Father's Angel	Laura	

=== Television ===
Year	Title	Role	Notes
1993	The Odyssey	Frances X	Episode: "The Brad Exchange"
1993	Liar, Liar	Kelly Farrow	TV film
1994	Are You Afraid of the Dark?	Cleo Dugan, Roxy Preston	Episodes: "The Tale of the Guardian's Curse", "The Tale of the Fire Ghost"
1995	Madeline	Chloe (voice)	Regular role (seasons 1–2)
1996	Murder at My Door	Jana McNair	TV film
1997	Ronnie & Julie	Clare	TV film
1997–1999	Honey, I Shrunk the Kids: The TV Show	Danielle	Recurring role (seasons 1–2)
1998	Night Man	Michelle	Episode: "The Ultraweb"
1999	So Weird	Claire Avner	Episode: "Escape"
1999	Hayley Wagner, Star	Stephanie Altree	TV film
2000	Scorn	Sylvia	TV film
2001, 2004	Cold Squad	Jessica, Lydia Frost	Episodes: "My So Called Death", "Teen Angel"
2001–2005	Edgemont	Anika Nedeau	Main role
2002	Jinnah: On Crime - Pizza 911	Crystal Wagner	TV film
2003	Jinnah: On Crime - White Knight, Black Widow	Crystal Wagner	TV film

== Awards and nominations ==
Year	Award	Category	Title of work	Result	Refs
1994	Gemini Award	Best Performance by an Actress in a Leading Role in a Dramatic Program or Mini-Series	Liar, Liar: Between Father and Daughter	Nominated	
2001	Gemini Award	Best Performance in a Children's or Youth Program or Series	Edgemont (for episode #1.12: "This Song's for You")	Nominated	
2002	Leo Award	Youth or Children's Program or Series: Best Performance or Host	Edgemont (for episode #2.13: "Freefall")	Nominated	
2003	Leo Award	Youth or Children's Program or Series: Best Performance	Edgemont (for episode #3.8: "Goodbye Cruel World")	Won	
