= Snakehead Terror =

- DVD cover
- Genre: Science fiction, horror
- Screenplay by: Anthony L. Greene
- Story by: Patrick J. Vitale
- Directed by: Paul Ziller
- Starring: Bruce Boxleitner; Carol Alt; William B. Davis; Chelan Simmons
- Music by: Ken Williams
- Countries of origin: Canada; United States
- Original language: English

Production
- Executive producers: David Bursteen; Lisa M. Hansen
- Producers: Elizabeth Sanchez; Paul Ziller
- Cinematography: Mark Dobrescu
- Editor: Paul Ziller
- Running time: 92 minutes
- Production companies: CineTel Films; Sci Fi Pictures

Original release
- Network: Sci Fi Channel
- Release: March 13, 2004

Snakehead Terror is a 2004 Canadian-American made-for-television science fiction-horror film and is one of two Sci Fi Channel films based on the snakehead fish incident in a Crofton, Maryland, pond. The other film is Frankenfish. Swarm of the Snakehead is an independently produced creature comedy based on the same Crofton incident, and the only one of the three actually filmed in Maryland. All three films are based on real fish called snakeheads.

== Plot ==
Snakehead fish invade Cultus Lake in the small town of Cultus, Maryland, although the town's police department poisons the lake, seemingly killing all of the fish. Two years later, bodies begin showing up in the lake, with town Sheriff Patrick James temporarily closing off the lake. After unseen creatures eat Patrick's daughter, Amber's boyfriend James, and James' friend, the bodies are inspected, and local doctor Jenkins gives Patrick a tooth he found in one of the bodies. Patrick attempts to convince the town's mayor to shut down the lake as the town suffers from economic troubles.

Marine biologist Lori Dale soon arrives in town to help Patrick determine the cause of the recent deaths. Lori identifies the creatures as unusually large snakeheads. She theorizes that something in the lake is causing the snakeheads to grow in size. After more deaths occur, Lori discovers the snakeheads have been drugged with human growth hormones to make them larger. A fisherman soon captures one of the snakeheads, further convincing the mayor that the lake should not be closed, believing that the captured snakehead was the only one. While Patrick and Lori head out on the lake to find the source of the hormones, Amber convinces her friends Jagger, Luke, and Craig to help her kill the snakeheads to avenge James.

Patrick and Lori find an overturned boat on the lake and encounter the snakeheads. They attempt to head back to shore, only to find Jenkins' brother Colin pouring something into the lake. Colin flees as they attempt to catch him, and Lori discovers that the liquid Colin poured into the lake was a human growth hormone. On Craig's boat, Amber, Jagger, Luke, and Craig discover that the snakeheads are cannibals and commonly eat the juvenile fish. They begin to follow some fish, only to almost collide with two fishermen on another boat. The snakeheads attack the two boats and eat Craig and one of the fishermen, while Luke is knocked overboard, and Jagger accidentally kills the other fisherman by shooting his boat's gas tank, blowing it up. Amber and Jagger then crash the boat on an island in the middle of the lake and become stranded. They try to call the police, although they have no reception. They then find Luke washed up on the island, alive.

Patrick and Deputy Reece sneak into Jenkins' lab to search for anything suspicious. They find a receipt for 5,000 units of human growth hormone. They arrest Jenkins, and he reveals that he put the hormones into the lake to increase the fish population for Colin's bait shop after the poisoning process occurred, not knowing the snakeheads were still in the lake. On the island, Amber, Jagger, and Luke find a cabin and a half-devoured man inside. Luke goes further and finds a snakehead devouring a woman. The snakehead attacks Luke, injuring his leg, although Amber kills it with an axe.

Patrick soon finds out that Amber is on the lake, and he and Lori head out to rescue her, with Lori bringing an electric stick that she plans to use to kill the snakeheads. However, the snakeheads ram the boat, causing Lori to accidentally render the controls useless with the stick, causing them to crash into a dock on the island. They see a giant, whale-sized snakehead before heading onto the island. In the meantime, Colin digs a hole to bury the hormone packages, only to be killed by the snakeheads. Meanwhile, snakeheads attack Amber, Jagger, and Luke in the house, although they manage to kill several, and their screams help Patrick and Lori find them, although Luke is still killed.

Patrick and Lori arrive outside the house and give Amber and Jagger directions to escape while they reach an electrical shed, planning to electrocute all of the snakeheads in the lake. Lori goes to rescue Amber and Jagger, and the three girls kill all of the remaining snakeheads at the cabin before Patrick knocks down an electric cable. When Lori, Amber, and Jagger arrive at the dock, Lori dumps the cable into the water, electrocuting and killing the remaining snakeheads. Patrick, Lori, Amber, and Jagger embrace as the fried snakehead bodies burn in the water.

== Cast ==
- Bruce Boxleitner as Sheriff Patrick James
- Carol Alt as Lori Dale
- Chelan Simmons as Amber James
- Juliana Wimbles as Jagger
- Ryan McDonell as Luke
- Chad Krowchuk as Craig
- Matthew MacCaull as James
- William B. Davis as Doc Jenkins
- Gary Jones as Colin Jenkins
- Alistair Abell as Sammy
- Doug Abrahams as Deputy Clark
- Bro Gilbert as Deputy Reece
- Scott Swanson as Mayor Cole
- P. Lynn Johnson as Norma
- Don MacKay as Ray Wilkens
- Manoj Sood as Raj
- Darren Moore as Zeke
- Brenda Campbell as Reporter
- Gardiner Millar as Hunter 1
- Sylvesta Stuart as Hunter 2
