= P. J. Prinsloo =

South African actor (born 1978)

- Born: Peter John Prinsloo; 6 February 1978 (age 48); Cape Town, South Africa
- Occupation: Actor
- Years active: 1995–present
- Spouse: Rukiya Bernard
- Children: 2

Peter John "P. J." Prinsloo (born 6 February 1978) is a South African actor based in Canada. He has had recurring roles on Edgemont as Chris Laidlaw and on Battlestar Galactica as Lt. Mei 'Freaker' Firelli.

Prinsloo has been a social justice youth facilitator since 1999. He began by teaching anti-violence and anti-racism workshops for the Attorney General of Canada, touring schools throughout British Columbia. Prinsloo has also run an improv theatre tournament since 1998.

== Personal life ==
P. J. Prinsloo is married to Rukiya Bernard, they have two children.

== Filmography ==
=== Television ===
- The X Files (1995) ... Tagger
- Breaker High (1997) ... Boarder
- Edgemont (2000-2005) ... Chris Laidlaw
- Smallville (2003, 2010) ... Punk, Ron Troupe
- The 4400 (2005) ... Teddy
  - "Voices Carry" (2005) ... Teddy
- Stargate: Atlantis (2006)
  - "No Man's Land" (2006) ... Anders
- Battlestar Galactica (2005-2006)
  - "Pegasus" (2005) ... Lt. Mei 'Freaker' Firelli
  - "Exodus" (2006) ... Lt. Mei 'Freaker' Firelli
  - "Resurrection Ship" (2006) ... Lt. Mei 'Freaker' Firelli

=== Film ===
- Disturbing Behavior (1998) ... Robby Stewart
- Black Rain (2009) ... Andrew
