= Edgemont (TV series) =

Television show filmed in Vancouver

- Edgemont intertitle
- Created by: Ian Weir
- Starring: Dominic Zamprogna; Sarah Lind; Kristin Kreuk; P.J. Prinsloo; Myles Ferguson; Richard Kahan; Micah Gardener; Elana Nep; Grace Park; Vanessa King
- Opening theme: "Start Again" by Annette Ducharme
- Country of origin: Canada
- Original language: English
- No. of seasons: 5
- No. of episodes: 70 (list of episodes)

Production
- Running time: 22–23 Minutes
- Production companies: Canadian Broadcasting Corporation; Omnifilm Entertainment

Original release
- Network: CBC Television
- Release: January 4, 2000 – July 21, 2004

Edgemont is a Canadian television series that aired from 2000 to 2004. Edgemont debuted January 4, 2000, on CBC Television and aired its final episode on July 21, 2004. There were a total of 70 episodes during its five-season run; the fifth season was shown commercial-free on the CBC. The series was created by Ian Weir, who also served as executive producer along with Michael Chechik. It was shot in the basement of the CBC Studios in Downtown Vancouver.

The 30-minute show delved into the lives of students at McKinley High School. The plots contained romance, intrigue, jealousy, and all the other elements associated with the adolescent and secondary school scene. The series also explored various social issues, such as racism and homosexuality.

== Plot ==
The first season's plot centres on the relationship, and subsequent breakup, of Jen and Mark. Mark begins to pursue Laurel, and they begin a relationship in the second season. The relationship is rocky due to the very different goals of the two. Mark and Laurel eventually break off the relationship but attempt to remain friends.

There are also many subplots, such as Anika's manipulation of her classmates and friends, Craig's various well-intentioned but ill-fated social projects, Shannon's sexuality crisis, the divorce of Mark, Travis, and Kat's parents, and the rise and fall of Chris's popularity. Many social issues, such as prejudice, divorce, sexuality, and teen pregnancy, are dealt with during the run of the series.

== Episodes ==
Season	Episodes	Originally released	
Season	Episodes	First released	Last released
1	13	January 4, 2000	April 5, 2000
2	13	October 5, 2000	December 7, 2000
3	13	September 19, 2001	November 29, 2001
4	18	October 16, 2002	December 12, 2002
5	13	April 28, 2004	July 21, 2004

== Cast ==
=== Main ===
- Dominic Zamprogna as Mark Deosdade
- Sarah Lind as Jen MacMahon
- Kristin Kreuk as Laurel Yeung
- P.J. Prinsloo as Chris Laidlaw
- Myles Ferguson as Scott Linton (season 1 (Note: Myles Ferguson died in a car accident shortly after the first season's filming was completed. The first episode of the second season was dedicated to his memory.))
- Micah Gardener as Craig Woodbridge
- Elana Nep as Erin Woodbridge
- Grace Park as Shannon Ng (Note: Park was moved up in the cast order after Season 1, being listed after Prinsloo for Seasons 2–5.)
- Vanessa King as Anika Nedeau
- Richard Kahan as Gil Kurvers (recurring, season 1; main, seasons 2–5)
- Meghan Black as Kat Deosdade (recurring, season 1; main, seasons 2–4)
- Daniella Evangelista as Tracey Antonelli (recurring, season 1; seasons 2–5)
- Chas Harrison as Kevin Michelsen (recurring, seasons 2–3; main, seasons 4–5)
- Chiara Zanni as Maggie Buckman (recurring, seasons 1–4; main, season 5)
- Jessica Lucas as Bekka Lawrence (recurring, seasons 2–3; main, seasons 4–5)

=== Recurring ===
- James Kirk as Travis Deosdade
- Chelan Simmons as Crystal (seasons 1–3)
- Nicole Leier as Kelsey Laidlaw (seasons 1–4)
- Andrew Robb as Wayne Litvack (seasons 3–5)
- John Henry Reardon as Josh Wyatt (seasons 3–5)
- Sarah Edmondson as Stevie (seasons 4–5)
- Adrian Petriw as Mitch Leckie (seasons 4–5)
- Britt Irvin as Paige Leckie (season 4)
- Vikki Krinsky as Shelby Derouche (season 4)

== Reception ==
=== Ratings ===
According to show creator Peter Weir, when Edgemont premiered three-quarters of its audience was over the age of 18, and even in its second season approximately half of the audience remained over 18 years of age. Second season episodes averaged approximately 300,000 Canadian viewers.

=== Critical ===
Edgemont received generally favourable reviews from The Globe and Mail critics John Doyle and Grant McIntyre.

== Broadcast ==
Edgemont aired on CBC in Canada from 2000 to 2004. The program became moderately successful in Canada, including Quebec where the series was dubbed in French.

In the United States, the series originally aired on Fox Family from January to August 2001, before being removed after completing the first season. The show eventually moved to Encore Wam starting in June 2005, which aired the series in its entirety. Edgemont later aired on TeenNick from 2009 to 2012, and also aired in syndication on the Fox, MyNetworkTV and The CW affiliates and on Sunday mornings on MeTV from 2012 to 2014 as part of the network's E/I-mandated programming. The series has been streamed online on Hulu.

Edgemont also aired in several other countries, including France.

== Home media ==
A very limited release of the complete series on DVD was offered in 2005 on a cost recovery basis from the official website. It is estimated that between 200 and 300 copies were produced. It was announced on the official website on May 25, 2006, that the DVDs had sold out.

== Streaming ==
As of 2018, the series has begun streaming for free on Canada Media Fund's Encore+ YouTube channel, which as of November 30, 2022, has ceased operations.
