= Cheaper by the Dozen (franchise) =

American film franchise

- Official film franchise logo, as released in 2021
- Based on: Characters created by Frank B. Gilbreth, Jr. Ernestine Gilbreth Carey
- Production companies: 20th Century Fox (entire films); Walt Disney Pictures (2022)
- Distributed by: 20th Century Fox (1950-1952, 2003-2005); Disney+ (2022)
- Country: United States
- Language: English

The Cheaper by the Dozen franchise consists of a series of films and stage adaptations, based on the real-life events of the Gilbreth family. Based on novels co-written by Frank B. Gilbreth, Jr. and Ernestine Gilbreth Carey, the film series includes two biographical films and three loosely-remade family comedy films inspired by their story. The general plot centers around the lives of parents with a large number of children. Each depicts familial relationships, and working through the challenges that arise with an over-sized household.

Cheaper by the Dozen (1950) was well-received critically and financially, which led to a sequel with Belles on Their Toes (1952). Years later, a fictional loose-remake based on the true-life family was adapted and released in 2003. Though it acquired mild critical reception, its box office returns inspired 20th Century Fox to greenlight a sequel titled Cheaper by the Dozen 2 (2005) which upon release received poor critical response.

A reboot of the franchise was exclusively released on Disney+ on March 18, 2022.

== Origin ==
The autobiographical novels Cheaper by the Dozen and Belles on Their Toes were written by siblings Frank B. Gilbreth Jr. and Ernestine Gilbreth Carey, and released in 1948 and 1952, respectively. The books detail their upbringing in a large family of 12 children, as well as the time and motion study techniques by which they were raised.

In Cheaper by the Dozen, the book details the eventful life of the wealthy Frank Bunker Gilbreth and Lillian Moller Gilbreth, in raising a large family. The couple tested and perfected their business practices, helping factories fine-tune their assembly lines for maximum output at minimum cost, and used these skills in their personal lives with their large number of children. The book includes the insights of two of its members, the authors, with the comedy and heart of growing up in an over-sized family. Throughout its pages, the authors seek to teach the importance of hard work. The events and stories within the book are organized topically while the book coming to an abrupt end, portraying the sudden real-life death of their father.

A sequel to the first novel, Belles on Their Toes details the family's continued adventures following the passing of Frank Bunker Gilbreth Sr., with Lillian's attempts to continue perfecting business practices. With the studies rendered and the knowledge she acquired with her husband, Lillian continues to work and provide for her large family. The novel details her role in taking over the profitable business, and the ways in which each family member contributed saving money and maximizing the family income. The Gilbreth family endured a chicken pox outbreak and the influence of an unwelcome boyfriend, and even met the President of the United States.

== Film ==
| Film | U.S. release date | Director | Screenwriter(s) | Story by | Producer(s) |
|---|---|---|---|---|---|
| Cheaper by the Dozen | March 31, 1950 | Walter Lang | Lamar Trotti | Lamar Trotti | Lamar Trotti |
| Belles on Their Toes | May 2, 1952 | Henry Levin | Henry Ephron & Phoebe Ephron | Henry Ephron & Phoebe Ephron | Samuel G. Engel |
| Cheaper by the Dozen | December 25, 2003 | Shawn Levy | Sam Harper, Joel Cohen & Alec Sokolow | Craig Titley | Ben Myron, Robert Simonds & Michael Barnathan |
| Cheaper by the Dozen 2 | December 21, 2005 | Adam Shankman | Sam Harper | Sam Harper | Ben Myron & Shawn Levy |
| Cheaper by the Dozen | March 18, 2022 | Gail Lerner | Kenya Barris & Jenifer Rice-Genzuk Henry | Kenya Barris & Jenifer Rice-Genzuk Henry | Kenya Barris |

=== Cheaper by the Dozen (1950) ===
As a biographical film, the plot details the story of the large Gilbreth family. Frank and Lillian Gilbreth work together in raising 12 children. As both are business professionals and renowned efficiency experts, the trials of raising their children are detailed with comedic situations. The married couple have added assistance from their oldest daughter, who oftentimes acts as a parental figure to her younger siblings. Though Frank and Lillian experience push-back from their children, the family works together to overcome the challenges of everyday life, and to strengthen the couple's company in work experiences. The family’s bond is tested with the sudden passing of Frank, due to heart failure. The family decides to continue to work together, while Lillian takes charge of the business.

=== Belles on Their Toes (1952) ===
After the death of her husband, Lillian Gilbreth works tirelessly to provide for her family, consisting of 12 children. The recent-widow seeks additional work to make extra money. Despite her engineering background, Lillian is challenged by sexist bigotry when applying for various jobs. The family works together, facing difficulties of young adulthood and in helping their mother with the cost of living.

=== Cheaper by the Dozen (2003) ===
Tom and Kate Baker find themselves the parents of 12 children. The couple came to a compromise with their working careers, early in their marriage, to provide for the large family. Tom is the sole breadwinner coaching college football, while Kate retires from her passion as a journalist to raise their kids. Their day-to-day lives suddenly change when Tom is offered the opportunity to coach at a collegiate level, at the same time that Kate's parenting memoir is purchased by a book publisher. Upon moving into a new home for Tom's new job, Kate leaves to begin her book tour. As Tom is left to care for the children, much comedic chaos ensues within the household. Through these events, Kate realizes she would rather be home with her family, while Tom realizes how difficult her job as a mother can be. Ultimately, Tom resigns from his job to spend more time with the family.

=== Cheaper by the Dozen 2 (2005) ===
After the wedding of their oldest daughter Nora and the upcoming birth of her first child, Tom and Kate Baker plan a vacation for their large family. Hoping for a relaxing summer vacation at a lakeside resort, the family realizes upon arrival that they will be staying in the most aged unit in the area. As it was the last rental available, Tom attempts to fix it up though his knowledge of household repairs is limited. Tom’s old rival, Jimmy Murtaugh and his equally large family, happen to be staying at the same resort. The not-so-friendly competitiveness, begins to spoil the trip. The Bakers’ teenage son Charlie falls in love with the Murtaughs’ teenage daughter Anne, and the Bakers’ preteen daughter Sarah falls in love with the Murtaughs’ preteen son Elliot. Sarah and Elliot go to the movies together, and their fathers come to the movie theater to spy on them, but Tom and Jimmy end up getting kicked out of the theater because the other moviegoers become suspicious of their behavior. The Bakers rally together to try and win the annual Labor Day competition against the Murtaughs. During the final challenge, Nora Baker goes into labor. The Murtaugh family abandons the task, coming to assist the Bakers which dissolves the discord between the households. Jimmy reveals that he was always jealous of Tom's popularity when they were growing up, and the two fathers become friends. The baby is born, and he is named Tom after his grandfather, with Nora stating that though her dad has never been perfect he's excelled in many ways at being a good father. Nora’s younger sister Lorraine is selected as the baby’s godmother. Nora and Charlie both decide to move to the lake.

=== Cheaper by the Dozen (2022) ===
In August 2019, following the acquisition of 21st Century Fox by Disney, The Walt Disney Company then-CEO Bob Iger announced that a reboot of Cheaper by the Dozen was in development and would premiere exclusively on the company's streaming service, Disney+. Later that month, Gail Lerner signed on as director, with a script co-written by Kenya Barris and Jenifer Rice-Genzuk Henry. Barris would also serve as producer. Principal photography was scheduled to commence on July 13, 2020, in Los Angeles, California. In March of the same year, however, filming on all Disney projects were halted due to the COVID-19 pandemic and industry restrictions worldwide. It ended up having bad reviews.

By November 2020, Disney's new CEO Bob Chapek announced that filming on all movies that had been postponed by the coronavirus had resumed filming, and in some cases completed principal photography. Gabrielle Union and Zach Braff were cast to co-star as the parents of the family in the film, while Journee Brown, Kylie Rogers, Andre Robinson, Caylee Blosenski, Aryan Simhadri, Leo A. Perry, Mykal-Michelle Harris, Christian Cote, Sebastian Cote and Luke Prael were cast as their children. The plot centers around a blended multiracial family, who navigate familial relationships and maintaining a family business. The film debuted on Disney+ on March 18, 2022. Principal photography began in April 2021.

== Main cast and characters ==
List indicators

This section includes characters who will appear or have appeared in the franchise in main roles.

- An empty grey cell indicates the character was not in the film, or that the character's official presence has not yet been confirmed.
- ^{A} indicates an appearance through archival footage or audio.
- ^{P} indicates an appearance in onscreen photographs.
- ^{U} indicates an uncredited appearance.
- ^{Y} indicates a younger version of the character.

| Character | Film | | | | |
| Character | Cheaper by the Dozen | Belles on Their Toes | Cheaper by the Dozen | Cheaper by the Dozen 2 | Cheaper by the Dozen |
| Character | 1950 | 1952 | 2003 | 2005 | 2022 |
Principal cast
| Frank Bunker Gilbreth, Sr. | Clifton Webb | Clifton Webb^{P} | | | Clifton Webb^{A} |
| Lillian Gilbreth | Myrna Loy | Myrna Loy | | | Myrna Loy^{A} |
| Anne "Annie" Gilbreth | Jeanne Crain | Jeanne Crain | | | |
| Ernestine "Ern" Gilbreth | Barbara Bates | Barbara Bates | | | |
| Mary Gilbreth | Betty Barker | | | | |
| Martha Gilbreth | Patti Brady | Debra Paget | | | |
| Frank Gilbreth, Jr. | Norman Ollestad | Robert Arthur | | | |
| William "Bill" Gilbreth | Jimmy Hunt | Tommy Ivo | | | |
| Lillian "Lillie" Gilbreth | Carol Nugent | Carol Nugent | | | |
| Fred Gilbreth | Anthony Sydes | Jimmy Hunt | | | |
| Dan Gilbreth | Teddy Driver | Anthony Sydes | | | |
| Jack Gilbreth | Roddy McCaskill | Teddy Driver | | | |
| Jane Gilbreth | Tina Thompson | June Hedin | | | |
| Robert "Bob" Gilbreth | Uncredited infant | Roddy McCaskill | | | |
| Tom Baker | | | Steve Martin | Steve Martin | |
| Kate Baker | | | Bonnie Hunt | Bonnie Hunt | |
| Nora Baker-McNulty | | | Piper Perabo Merris Carden^{Y}^{U} | Piper Perabo | |
| Charlie Baker | | | Tom Welling | Tom Welling | |
| Lorraine Baker | | | Hilary Duff | Hilary Duff | |
| Henry Baker | | | Kevin G. Schmidt | Kevin G. Schmidt | |
| Sarah Baker | | | Alyson Stoner | Alyson Stoner | |
| Jake Baker | | | Jacob Smith | Jacob Smith | |
| Mark Baker | | | Forrest Landis | Forrest Landis | |
| Jessica Baker | | | Liliana Mumy | Liliana Mumy | |
| Kim Baker | | | Morgan York | Morgan York | |
| Mike Baker | | | Blake Woodruff | Blake Woodruff | |
| Kyle Baker | | | Brent Kinsman | Brent Kinsman | |
| Nigel Baker | | | Shane Kinsman | Shane Kinsman | |
| Paul Baker | | | | | Zach Braff |
| Zoey Clayton-Baker | | | | | Gabrielle Union |
| Deja Clayton-Baker | | | | | Journee Brown |
| Deja Clayton-Baker | | | | | Kyrie McAlpin^{Y} |
| Ella Baker | | | | | Kylie Rogers |
| DJ Clayton-Baker | | | | | Andre Robinson |
| DJ Clayton-Baker | | | | | Elias Murphy^{Y} |
| Harley Baker | | | | | Caylee Blosenski |
| Harley Baker | | | | | Annalyn Black^{Y} |
| Haresh Baker | | | | | Aryan Simhadri |
| Haresh Baker | | | | | Niam Saharan^{Y} |
| Luca Baker | | | | | Leo Abelo Perry |
| Luna Baker | | | | | Mykal-Michelle Harris |
| Bailey Baker | | | | | Christian Cote |
| Bronx Baker | | | | | Sebastian Cote |
| Seth Baker | | | | | Luke Prael |
Supporting cast
| Tom Black | Craig Hill^{U} | | | | |
| Joe Scales | Benny Bartlett^{U} | | | | |
| Dr. Burton | Edgar Buchanan | | | | |
| Mrs. Monahan | Sara Allgood^{U} | | | | |
| Shake McGuire | | | Richard Jenkins | | |
| Tina Shenk | | | Paula Marshall | | |
| Bill Shenk | | | Alan Ruck | | |
| Dylan Shenk | | | Steven Anthony Lawrence | | |
| Hank | | | Ashton Kutcher^{U} | | |
| Diana Phillips | | | Vanessa Bell Calloway | | |
| Quinn | | | Cody Linley | | |
| Cooper | | | Adam Taylor Gordon | | |
| Jimmy Murtaugh | | | | Eugene Levy | |
| Sarina Murtaugh | | | | Carmen Electra | |
| Bud McNulty | | | | Jonathan Bennett | |
| Calvin Murtaugh | | | | Shawn Roberts | |
| Anne Murtaugh | | | | Jaime King | |
| Daniel Murtaugh | | | | Robbie Amell | |
| Becky Murtaugh | | | | Melanie Tonello | |
| Elliot Murtaugh | | | | Taylor Lautner | |
| Lisa Murtaugh | | | | Courtney Fitzpatrick | |
| Robin Murtaugh | | | | Madison Fitzpatrick | |
| Kenneth Murtaugh | | | | Alexander Conti | |
| Mike Romanow | | | | Peter Keleghan | |
| Kate | | | | | Erika Christensen |
| Dominic "Dom" Clayton | | | | | Timon Durrett |
| Melanie | | | | | Brittany Daniel |
| Michele | | | | | Cynthia Daniel Hauser |
| Tricia | | | | | Abby Elliott |
| Anne Vaughn | | | | | June Diane Raphael |
| Chris | | | | | Simeon Daise |
| Thalia | | | | | Lola Raie |

== Additional crew and production details ==
| Film | Crew | | | | |
| Film | Composer | Cinematographer | Editor(s) | Production companies | Distributing company |
|---|---|---|---|---|---|
| Cheaper by the Dozen (1950) | Cyril J. Mockridge | Leon Shamroy | James Watson Webb Jr. | 20th Century Fox | |
| Belles on Their Toes | Cyril J. Mockridge | Arthur E. Arling | Robert Fritch | 20th Century Fox | |
| Cheaper by the Dozen (2003) | Christophe Beck | Jonathan Brown | George Folsey, Jr. | 20th Century Fox; Robert Simonds Productions | 20th Century Fox |
| Cheaper by the Dozen 2 | John Debney | Peter James | Matthew Cassel & Christopher Greenbury | 20th Century Fox; 21 Laps Entertainment; Dozen Canada Productions | 20th Century Fox |
| Cheaper by the Dozen (2022) | John Paesano | Mitchell Amundsen | Troy Takaki | Khalabo Ink Society; Walt Disney Pictures; 20th Century Studios | Disney+ |

== Reception ==
=== Box office and financial performance ===
| Film | Box office gross | | | Box office ranking | | Budget | Net income/loss | Ref. |
| Film | North America | Other territories | Worldwide | All-time North America | All-time worldwide | Budget | Net income/loss | Ref. |
|---|---|---|---|---|---|---|---|---|
| Cheaper by the Dozen (1950) | $4,425,000 | —N/a | $4,425,000 | not available | not available | $1,700,000 | $2,725,000 | |
| Belles on Their Toes | $2,000,000 | —N/a | $2,000,000 | not available | not available | $1,130,000 | $870,000 | |
| Cheaper by the Dozen (2003) | $138,614,544 | $51,597,569 | $190,212,113 | #431 | #1,686 | $40,000,000 | $150,212,113 | |
| Cheaper by the Dozen 2 | $82,571,173 | $47,583,395 | $130,154,568 | #953 | #1,667 | $60,000,000 | $70,154,568 | |
| Cheaper by the Dozen (2022) | —N/a | —N/a | —N/a | —N/a | —N/a | Information not publicly available | Information not publicly available | |

=== Critical and public response ===
| Film | Rotten Tomatoes | Metacritic | CinemaScore |
|---|---|---|---|
| Cheaper by the Dozen (1950) | 80% (5 reviews) | —N/a | —N/a |
| Belles on Their Toes | —N/a | —N/a | —N/a |
| Cheaper by the Dozen (2003) | 24% (119 reviews) | 46/100 (17 reviews) | A− |
| Cheaper by the Dozen 2 | 6% (94 reviews) | 34/100 (24 reviews) | A− |
| Cheaper by the Dozen (2022) | 37% (38 reviews) | 42/100 (11 reviews) | —N/a |

== Stage adaptations ==
=== Play ===
A stage adaptation of the novel was released in 1992. The adaptation, written by Christopher Sergel, follows the premise of the autobiography with similarities to the feature films. Written for an adolescent to college-age audience, the play primarily follows the point of view of Anne Gilbreth, the primary character. The plot details the events of Anne's every-day popularity in high school. Her father Frank, is esteemed as a pioneer of industrial efficiency, uses his work skills upon the large family of 14 individuals. Seeking to save money and to find a more organized living for his family, Frank comedically pushes forward with unorthodox practices. Over the course of the play, Anne learns amidst her frustrations that the secret reason her father has been behaving differently is that he has a serious heart condition. In turn, Frank comes to the sentimental realization that his daughter has grown.

=== Musical ===
A comedy-musical adaptation of the play by Christopher Sergel debuted with a score and lyrics co-written by David Rogers and Mark Bucci. Similar to the play, Cheaper by the Dozen: The Musical takes liberties with the source material. Frank Gilbreth was an expert in industrial efficiency, and throughout the musical sings numbers dedicated to this achievement. The family doesn't understand why he begins to push his restrictive ways upon them, but his oldest daughters rebel against his attempts. The oldest daughter named Anne, seeks for her independence from the rules set by her father. As the father's worsening heart condition comes to light, the family begins to realize the levity of his actions. Frank wants his large family of 14 individuals to be able to survive, when he is no longer on the Earth. A mutual respect grows between Anne and Frank, as she moves away to college.
