= Cheaper by the Dozen (disambiguation) =

Cheaper by the Dozen is a biographical novel written by Frank Bunker Gilbreth Jr. and Ernestine Gilbreth Carey, published in 1948.

Cheaper by the Dozen may also refer to:

- Cheaper by the Dozen (1950 film), a Technicolor film based on the novel
- Cheaper by the Dozen (2003 film), an American family comedy film starring Steve Martin
  - Cheaper by the Dozen 2, a 2005 sequel to the 2003 film
- Cheaper by the Dozen (2022 film), a remake of the 1950 film
