= Frederick Delger =

German-American businessman

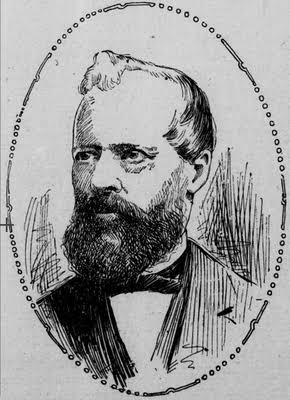
- Born: March 11, 1822; Kingdom of Saxony
- Died: April 25, 1898 (aged 76); Oakland, California, U.S.
- Known for: Oakland's first millionaire
- Spouse: Ernestine Blütcher
- Children: 4
- Relatives: Lillian Moller Gilbreth (granddaughter); Annie Florence Brown (granddaughter); Ernestine Gilbreth Carey (great granddaughter); Frank Gilbreth Jr. (great grandson); Robert Moller Gilbreth (great grandson)

Frederick William Delger (1822–1898) was a German-born businessman in Oakland, California. He became a shoe retailer after immigrating to the United States and was the richest man in Oakland by the time of his death, called Oakland's first millionaire.

== Biography ==
Delger was born March 11, 1822 in the Kingdom of Saxony to Gottlieb Delger and Dorothea Wechtler. He served three years as a bookmaker's apprentice before immigrating to New York City in 1847. He was married there to Ernestine Blütcher in 1848.

In 1853, he moved to California by way of Cape Horn and settled there, finding employment. In 1855, he opened a retail shoe store, which was successful, and later expanded into Sacramento.

Once he had become wealthy as a shoe merchant, he expanded his interests into real estate.

He became a stockholder and director at the Oakland Bank of Savings.

He owned most of downtown Oakland. He was also responsible for one of the buildings in Preservation Park.

Delger's daughter, Annie, married William Moller, a builder's supply merchant. Their daughter was Lillian Moller Gilbreth, a central figure in Cheaper by the Dozen.

He died at the Delger estate in Oakland on April 25, 1898 at the age of 76.
