= Tom Welling =

American actor, podcaster, director, and model (born 1977)

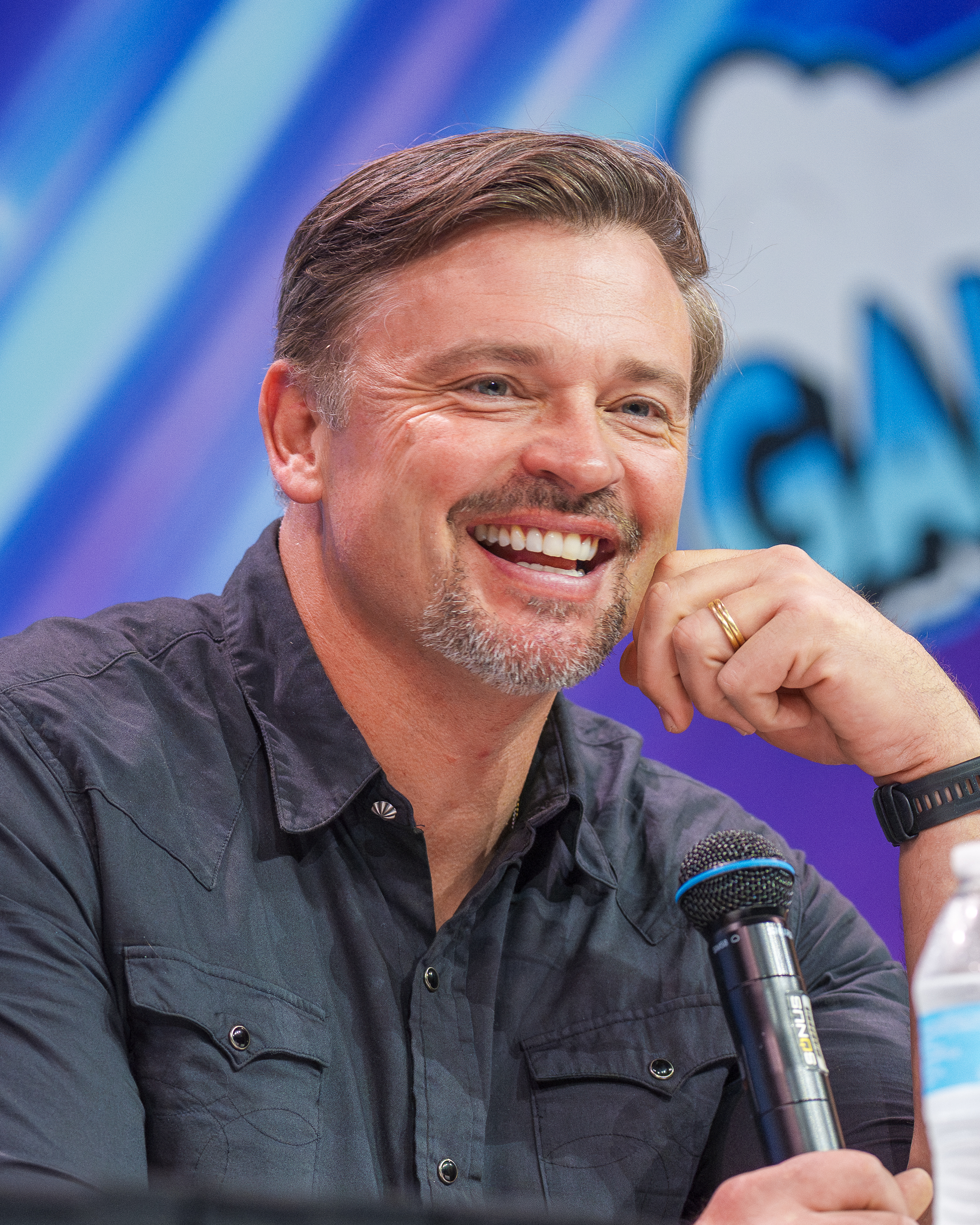
- Welling at the Galaxy Con Richmond in 2026
- Born: Thomas Joseph Welling; April 26, 1977 (age 49); Putnam Valley, New York, U.S.
- Occupations: Actor; director; producer
- Years active: 1997–present
- Spouses: Jamie White (m. 2002; div. 2015); Jessica Rose Lee (m. 2019)
- Children: 2

Thomas Joseph Welling (born April 26, 1977) is an American actor, director, and producer. He is best known for his role as Clark Kent/Kal El in The WB (now The CW) superhero drama Smallville (2001–2011). He also co-starred in the third season of the Fox fantasy comedy-drama Lucifer as Lt. Marcus Pierce/Cain (2017–2018).

A high school athlete, Welling initially worked in construction and, in 1997, he began modelling men's clothing for several popular brands including Abercrombie & Fitch, Dior, and Thomas Burberry. In 2000, he transitioned to television. He has been nominated and received several awards for his role as Clark Kent. In 2001, he had a recurring role as Rob "Karate Rob" Meltzer in the second season of the CBS legal drama Judging Amy. His films include Cheaper by the Dozen (2003), Cheaper by the Dozen 2 (2005), The Fog (2005), Draft Day (2014), and The Choice (2016). In 2022, he starred as Samuel Campbell in the dark fantasy series The Winchesters. He has also been involved behind the camera as an executive producer and a director.

== Early life ==
Welling was born in Putnam Valley, New York. His family moved frequently, making stops in Wisconsin, Delaware, and Michigan. Welling attended Okemos High School in Okemos, Michigan, where he started acting in plays, but then switched to sports. Welling played baseball and soccer, but his favorite sport is basketball. Welling is one of four children, with two older sisters, Rebecca and Jamie, and a younger brother, Mark Welling, who is also an actor.

== Career ==
=== Early career ===
Originally a construction worker, Welling was discovered in 1998 at a party in Nantucket by casting director Jennifer Starr who was there finding fresh faces for a Tommy Hilfiger campaign and suggested he try modeling. Welling modeled for Louisa Modeling Agency until 2000, when he relocated to Los Angeles. There he modeled for Tommy Hilfiger, Abercrombie & Fitch, and Calvin Klein while pursuing an acting career. In 2000, Welling appeared in Angela Via's music video "Picture Perfect" where he played Vía's love interest. Welling has said that he did not like modeling and that he was not good at it because it was all on the outside or from an external point of view. He pursued acting because he wanted to express a range of emotions, but Welling still models occasionally and appeared in the May 2008 issue of Vogue, the so-called Superhero Issue. In his first major acting role, Welling played karate teacher Rob "Karate Rob" Meltzer, a younger love interest of Amy Gray (Amy Brenneman) in the second season of the CBS legal drama Judging Amy, which aired in 2001. Welling was originally signed for three episodes, but after receiving good feedback, the producers kept him for three more. Welling also had a small role in the pilot episode of the UPN science fiction sitcom Special Unit 2, and he appeared in the pilot episode of the short-lived Fox sitcom Undeclared.

=== Smallville ===
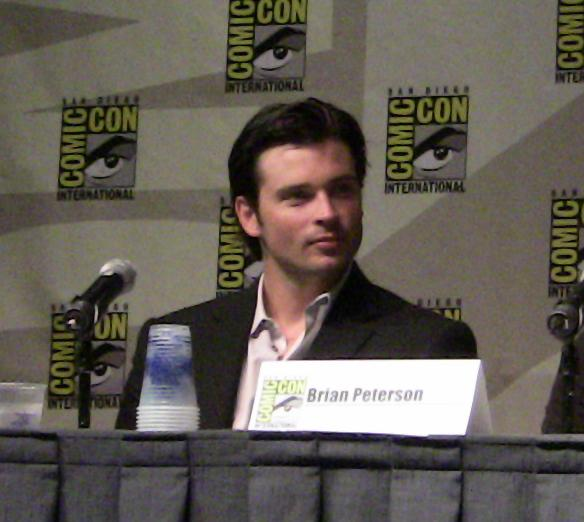
Welling at the 2009 Comic-Con

Welling was cast in the WB superhero drama Smallville after a nationwide search for an actor to play Clark Kent. In an interview with a teen magazine, Welling spoke about the day he auditioned for the role: "I was on my way back from the Warner Bros. studio, and I stopped in a gas station to call my manager and tell him how it went. I called and got him on the phone and he said, 'Can you hold on a second?' Next thing I know, there are literally seven people on the other line and almost in unison they say, 'Tom, you got it!'" The pilot aired in October 2001 and became the highest-rated debut for The WB, with 8.4 million viewers. Welling told TV Guide that he turned down the lead role twice, but after reading the script, decided to take the job. Like Christopher Reeve, he was not a Superman fan before being cast as Clark Kent. In fact, he said, he continued to not read Superman comics: "I made a conscious decision to stay away from that material. We're doing something different at a time before all that, I don't want that to affect what I'm doing, even subconsciously." He did get the chance to meet two previous Superman actors: Christopher Reeve, who appeared in season 2: episode 17 titled "Rosetta", and Dean Cain, who appeared in season 7: episode 4 titled "Cure".

Welling was named one of People magazine's "Breakthrough Stars of 2001", and also won the Teen Choice Award as "Choice Breakout Star (Male)" in 2002 for his role as Clark Kent. Following the third season, Welling was interviewed by Smallville Magazine and said that if he could play one character on the show that was not Clark Kent, it would be Lex Luthor; "Lex Luthor! I wouldn't mind having my head shaved—as an actor, [it is the ultimate,] getting to play the complete opposite of your character."

In 2003, Welling said he met with director Brett Ratner about potentially playing Clark Kent/Superman in the superhero film Superman Returns (2006), but scheduling conflicted with Smallville. Comic book artist Alex Ross even did two sketches of Welling as the "Man of Steel" to see what the actor would look like in the famous costume. In August 2009, Welling won another Teen Choice Award as "Choice TV Actor (Action Adventure)" for Smallville.

In 2019, Welling reprised his role as Clark Kent in the Batwoman episode of the CW Arrowverse crossover event "Crisis on Infinite Earths", along with his Smallville co-star Erica Durance as Lois Lane. Welling's reprisal concluded his incarnation's story where it showed Clark gave up his powers, retired as an average farmer, and has at least two daughters with Lois.

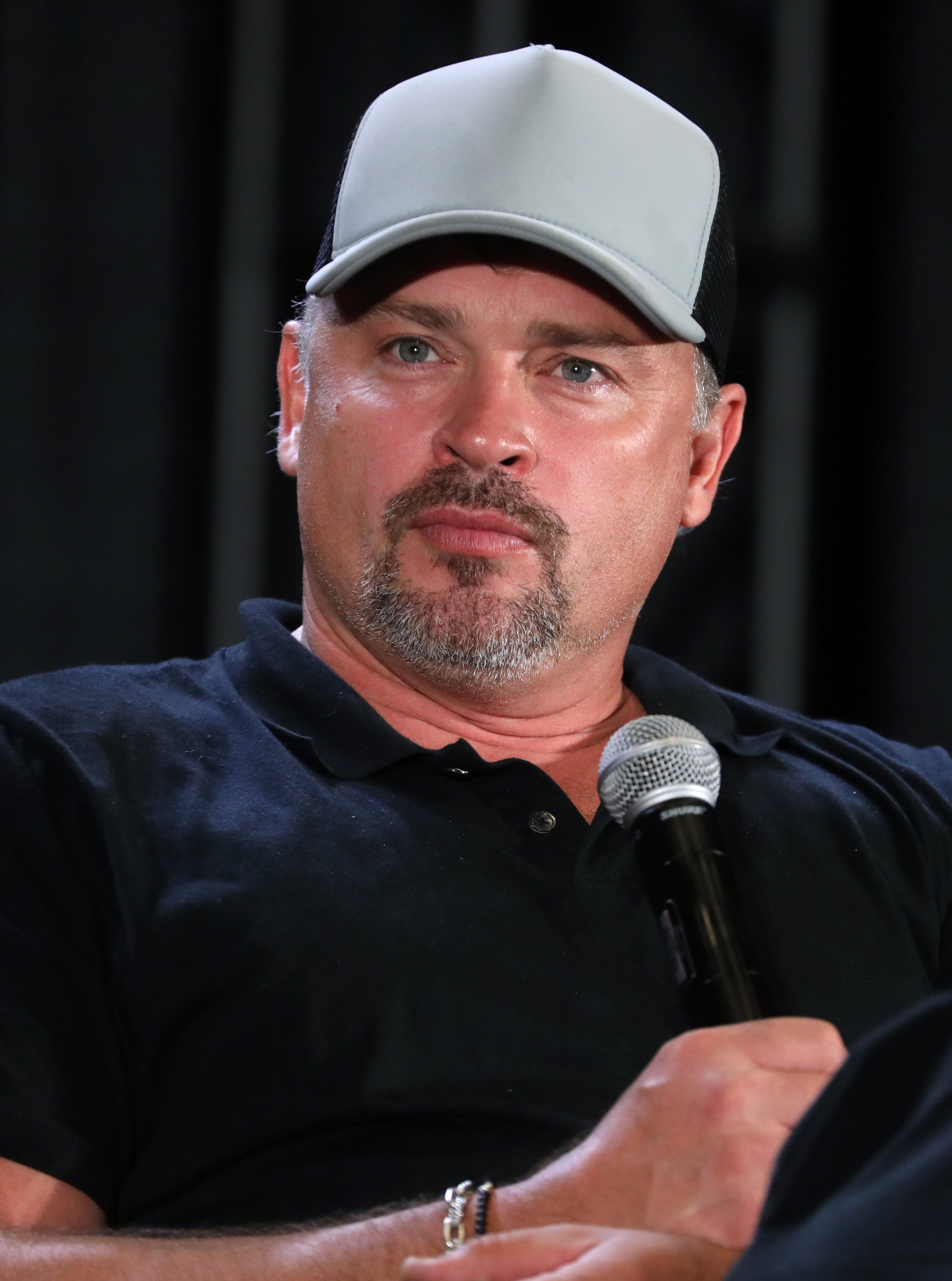
Welling in 2024

On July 13, 2022, Welling and fellow Smallville actor Michael Rosenbaum launched the podcast Talkville, where the two co-stars comment on every episode of Smallville.

=== Lucifer ===
In 2017, Welling made his much-awaited return to television when he was cast to co-star in the third season of the Fox fantasy comedy-drama Lucifer. He played Marcus Pierce, a police lieutenant at the precinct and the main antagonist of the season who is the immortal Cain.

When asked why he suddenly decided to return to television, he told Entertainment weekly: 'Shortly after I got a call from a very dear friend of mine, Greg Beeman, who was our showrunner on Smallville for many years and had directed episodes of Lucifer, and he goes, "I hear that your name's in the mix to be on Lucifer. I know you, I've worked on the show, you're going to love it, don't overthink it." So then I binge-watched about six episodes of the show, because I was familiar with the show, but they were like, "Take a look at these six that we recommend for you to watch, these are our favorites," and I watched them all, and Wednesday morning the conversation was, "I don't want to do 10 episodes," and they said, "Well, you have to do 10, it's 10 or nothing." I said, "I want to do more, I want to do 15," and so we signed on for 15 episodes, because I like it that much, and having met the cast and the crew they're so much fun. They have a good time, they get their work done, they're professional, but they're enjoying themselves. I like the show, the show's fun. It doesn't take itself too seriously, but they solve bit crimes and their issues and stuff like that.'

=== Film ===
In December 2003, Welling made his feature film debut as Charlie Baker, the oldest son and second-oldest in the Baker family which had 12 children, in the family comedy Cheaper by the Dozen with Steve Martin and Bonnie Hunt, which is a remake of the 1950 movie starring Clifton Webb and Myrna Loy, based on the 1948 book about the family of Frank and Lillian Gilbreth and written by two of their children. Welling talked about why he was interested in the project in an interview with Paul Fischer: "The top three reasons I decided to do this film were, one, Steve Martin, two, Steve Martin and three, Steve Martin. That was the number one draw for me. Then, after reading the script, I really liked this character, Charlie. I liked what he went through, what he had to go through, and I felt I understood where he was coming from. And I just wanted to be a part of it." Welling had always been a fan of Martin's and said that he "absolutely loved" working with him.

In 2005, Welling co-starred in the horror film The Fog, a remake of John Carpenter's 1980 film of the same name, as Nick Castle (a character originally played by Tom Atkins). At the same time The Fog was in production, Welling was still working on the last few episodes of the fourth season of Smallville. The same year, he reprised his role as Charlie Baker in Cheaper by the Dozen 2.

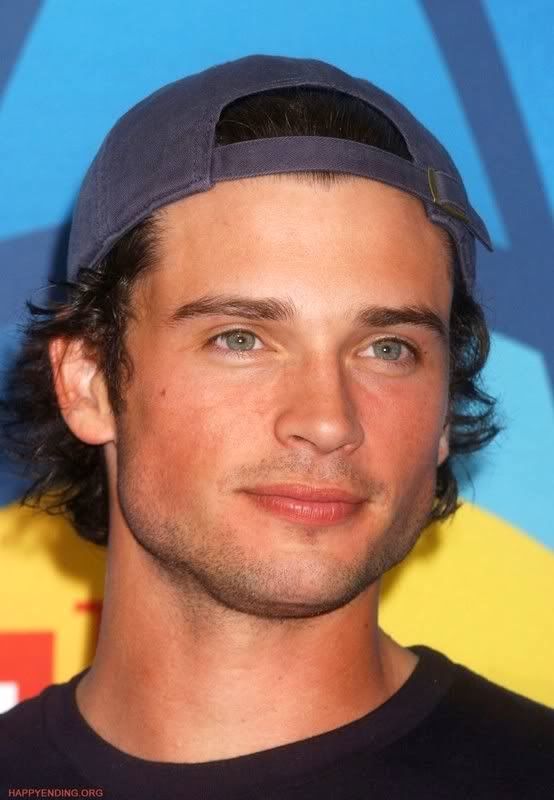
Welling in 2004

In 2013, Welling was among the all-star cast of the historical drama Parkland, based on the book Reclaiming History: The Assassination of President John F. Kennedy by author Vincent Bugliosi. The story centers on the chaotic events that occurred at Parkland Hospital in Dallas, Texas on the day President John F. Kennedy was assassinated on November 22, 1963. In 2014, Welling co-starred in Ivan Reitman's sports drama Draft Day. He played a veteran quarterback whose career is at a crossroads.

=== Production ===
For Smallville's ninth season, Welling served as a co-executive producer. He returned as Clark Kent for the show's tenth and final season in Fall 2010 and became a full executive producer, as credited in a May 20, 2010 press release by the CW.

Welling served as an executive producer of the CW comedy-drama Hellcats based on journalist Kate Torgovnick's book Cheer: Inside the Secret World of College Cheerleaders. The series first aired on The CW beginning in the fall of 2010, and was canceled on May 17, 2011. According to Welling, the reason of cancellation was because of the change of CW president of entertainment from Dawn Ostroff to Mark Pedowitz.

=== Directing ===
Welling made his directorial debut in 2006 with the Smallville episode "Fragile" (5.18). He also directed "Hydro" (6.10); the show's 150th episode, "Apocalypse" (7.18); "Injustice" (8.21); the second part ("Legends") of the two-hour episode "Absolute Justice" (9.11); and two episodes of Smallville's final season, "Patriot" (10.09) and "Booster" (10.18).

== Personal life ==
On July 5, 2002, Welling married model Jamie White on Martha's Vineyard with Welling's friends and then-Smallville co-stars Kristin Kreuk and Michael Rosenbaum in attendance. Welling and White resided in Vancouver, British Columbia, but returned to Los Angeles in March 2011. On October 17, 2013, White filed for divorce from Welling. The divorce was finalized in November 2015.

In 2014, Welling began dating equestrian and Saddle Club founder Jessica Rose Lee. In April 2018, they announced their engagement. The couple has two sons, born in January 2019 and June 2021. Welling and Lee married on November 30, 2019, at Sunstone Vineyards & Winery in Santa Ynez, California.

Welling plays golf in his spare time.

He said in YM that he dislikes interviews; "I don't want to be a celebrity for the sake of being a celebrity. I want to work and then go home and live in private." Welling has also said he disliked modeling because it was not fulfilling and was not an expressive job.

On January 26, 2025, Welling was arrested in Yreka, California for driving under the influence. On May 19, 2025, the DUI charge was dropped after he pleaded no contest, which required him to serve one year of probation, pay $619 in fines and $150 in restitution, and attend a DUI program.

== Filmography ==
=== Film ===
Year	Title	Role	Notes
2003	Cheaper by the Dozen	Charlie Baker	
2005	The Fog	Nicholas "Nick" Castle	
2005	Cheaper by the Dozen 2	Charlie Baker	
2013	Parkland	Secret Service Agent Roy Kellerman	
2014	Draft Day	Brian Drew	
2016	The Choice	Dr. Ryan McCarthy	
2024	Clear Cut	Keen	
2024	Mafia Wars	Terry	
2026	Chasing Summer	Chase	Post-production

=== Television ===
Year	Title	Role	Notes
2001	Judging Amy	Rob Meltzer	6 episodes
2001	Special Unit 2	Male victim	Episode: "The Depths"
2001	Undeclared	Tom	Episode: "Prototype"
2001–2011	Smallville	Kal-El / Clark Kent / Superman	Main role
2017–2018	Lucifer	Lt. Marcus Pierce / Cain	19 episodes
2019	Batwoman	Kal-El / Clark Kent / Superman	Episode: "Crisis on Infinite Earths Part 2"
2020	Professionals	Vincent Corbo	10 episodes
2022	The Winchesters	Samuel Campbell	3 episodes

=== Crew role ===
Year	Title	Notes
2006–2011	Smallville	Director; Episode 5.18 "Fragile"; Episode 6.10 "Hydro"; Episode 7.18 "Apocalypse"; Episode 8.21 "Injustice"; Episode 9.11 "Absolute Justice Part 2"; Episode 10.09 "Patriot"; Episode 10.18 "Booster"
2009–2010	Smallville	Co-executive producer 22 episodes
2010–2011	Hellcats	Co-executive producer 22 episodes
2020	Professionals	Executive producer 10 episodes

=== Music video ===
Year	Title	Artist	Role
2000	"Picture Perfect"	Angela Via	Vía's love interest

== Awards and nominations ==
Tom Welling awards and nominations
Awards and nominations
Award	Wins	Nominations
Teen Choice	2	10
Academy of Science Fiction, Fantasy and Horror Films	0	5

Totals (Note: Certain award groups do not simply award one winner. They acknowledge several different recipients, have runners-up, and have third place. Since this is a specific recognition and is different from losing an award, runner-up mentions are considered wins in this award tally. For simplification and to avoid errors, each award in this list has been presumed to have had a prior nomination.)
- Wins: 2
- Nominations: 15

The following is a list of awards and nominations received by Tom Welling throughout his acting career.

Awards	Year	Category	Work	Result
Saturn Awards	2002	Best Actor on Television	Smallville	Nominated
Saturn Awards	2003	Best Actor on Television	Smallville	Nominated
Saturn Awards	2004	Best Actor on Television	Smallville	Nominated
Saturn Awards	2005	Best Actor on Television	Smallville	Nominated
Saturn Awards	2006	Best Actor on Television	Smallville	Nominated
Teen Choice Awards	2002	Choice Drama TV Actor	Smallville	Nominated
Teen Choice Awards	2002	Choice Breakout TV Star: Male	Smallville	Won
Teen Choice Awards	2002	Choice Male Hottie	Himself	Nominated
Teen Choice Awards	2003	Choice TV Actor: Drama/Action Adventure	Smallville	Nominated
Teen Choice Awards	2003	Choice Male Hottie	Himself	Nominated
Teen Choice Awards	2004	Choice Breakout Movie Actor	Cheaper by the Dozen	Nominated
Teen Choice Awards	2004	Choice TV Actor: Drama/Action Adventure	Smallville	Nominated
Teen Choice Awards	2004	Choice Male Hottie	Himself	Nominated
Teen Choice Awards	2005	Choice TV Actor: Drama	Smallville	Nominated
Teen Choice Awards	2006	Shared with Kristin Kreuk	Smallville	Nominated
Teen Choice Awards	2008	Choice TV Actor: Action	Smallville	Nominated
Teen Choice Awards	2009	Choice TV Actor: Action	Smallville	Won
Teen Choice Awards	2010	Choice TV Actor: Fantasy/Sci-Fi	Smallville	Nominated
Teen Choice Awards	2011	Choice TV Actor: Fantasy/Sci-Fi	Smallville	Nominated
