= Therblig =

Basic motions in ergonomics

Therbligs are elemental motions used in the study of workplace motion economy. A workplace task is analyzed by recording each of the therblig units for a process, with the results used for optimization of manual labour by eliminating unneeded movements. Eighteen therbligs have been defined.

The word therblig was the creation of Frank Bunker Gilbreth and Lillian Moller Gilbreth, American industrial psychologists who invented the field of time and motion study. It is a reversal of the name Gilbreth, with 'th' transposed.

== Elements ==
The standard symbols used in representing the 18 therbligs.

A basic motion element is one of a set of fundamental motions used by a worker to perform a manual operation or task. The set consists of 18 elements, each describing one activity.

- Search (Sh): attempting to find an object using the eyes and hands.
- Use (U): manipulating a tool in the intended way during the course of working.
- Find (F): A momentary mental reaction at the end of the Search cycle. Seldom used.
- Disassemble (DA): separating multiple components that were joined.
- Select (St): Choosing among several objects in a group.
- Inspect (I): determining the quality or the characteristics of an object using the eyes and/or other senses.
- Grasp (G): grasping an object with the active hand.
- Pre-position (PP): positioning and/or orienting an object for the next operation and relative to an approximation location.
- Hold (H): holding an object.
- Release load (RL): releasing control of an object.
- Transport loaded (TL): moving an object using a hand motion.
- Unavoidable delay (UD): waiting due to factors beyond the worker's control and included in the work cycle.
- Transport empty [unloaded] (TE): receiving an object with an empty hand. (Now called "Reach".)
- Avoidable delay (AD): pausing for reasons under the worker's control that is not part of the regular work cycle.
- Position (P): positioning and/or orienting an object in the defined location.
- Plan (Pn): deciding on a course of action.
- Assemble (A): joining two parts together.
- Rest (R): resting to overcome a fatigue, consisting of a pause in the motions of the hands and/or body during the work cycles or between them.

== Effective and ineffective basic motion elements ==
Effective:

- Reach
- Move
- Grasp
- Release Load
- Use
- Assemble
- Disassemble
- Pre-Position

Ineffective:

- Hold
- Rest
- Position
- Search
- Select
- Plan
- Unavoidable Delay
- Avoidable Delay
- Inspect

== Sample usage ==
Here is an example of how therbligs can be used to analyze motion:

...Suppose a man goes into a bathroom and shave[s]. We'll assume that his face is all lathered and that he is ready to pick up his razor. He knows where the razor is, but first he must locate it with his eye. That is "search", the first Therblig. His eye finds it and comes to rest—that's "find", the second Therblig. Third comes "select", the process of sliding the razor prior to the fourth Therblig, "grasp". Fifth is "transport loaded", bringing the razor up to his face, and sixth is "position", getting the razor set on his face. There are eleven other Therbligs—the last one is "think"!

— Frank Gilbreth Jr. and Ernestine Gilbreth Carey, Cheaper by the Dozen

== History ==
In an article published in 1915, Frank Gilbreth wrote of 16 elements: "The elements of a cycle of decisions and motions, either running partly or wholly concurrently with other elements in the same or other cycles, consist of the following, arranged in varying sequences: 1. Search, 2. Find, 3. Select, 4. Grasp, 5. Position, 6. Assemble, 7. Use, 8. Dissemble, or take apart, 9. Inspect, 10. Transport, loaded, 11. Pre-position for next operation, 12. Release load, 13. Transport, empty, 14. Wait (unavoidable delay), 15. Wait (avoidable delay), 16. Rest (for overcoming fatigue)."
