= Belles on Their Toes =

1950 book by Frank Bunker Gilbreth Jr. and Ernestine Gilbreth Carey

- First US edition
- Author: Ernestine Gilbreth Carey; Frank Bunker Gilbreth Jr.
- Illustrator: Donald McKay
- Language: English
- Publisher: Thomas Y. Crowell (US); Heinemann (UK)
- Publication date: June 1950
- Publication place: United States
- Pages: 237
- ISBN: 0-690-13023-6
- Preceded by: Cheaper by the Dozen

Belles on Their Toes is a 1950 autobiographical book written by the siblings Frank Bunker Gilbreth, Jr. and Ernestine Gilbreth Carey. It is the follow-up to their book Cheaper by the Dozen (1948), and covers the period after Frank Gilbreth, Sr. died. It was adapted as a film in 1952.

== Title ==
The title is based on the line "Rings on her fingers and bells on her toes" in the nursery rhyme "Ride a cock horse to Banbury Cross" and alludes to the marriages of the Gilbreth sisters: "It was apparent that in order to get rings on their fingers, belles would have to be on their toes."

== Synopsis ==
Belles on Their Toes was written about the Gilbreth family after Frank Bunker Gilbreth, Sr.'s death, and how they survived as their mother, Lillian Moller Gilbreth, continued the pioneering work in industrial engineering, time and motion studies, and industrial and organizational psychology she had shared with her husband. This book is also the first place where the absence of the second oldest child, Mary Gilbreth, is explained; she died of diphtheria in 1912, at age five.

Ernestine and Frank decided to share the royalties from the books and movies evenly among their mother and siblings.

== Film adaptation ==
Belles on Their Toes was made into a 1952 motion picture starring Myrna Loy as Lillian Gilbreth. Cheaper by the Dozen 2 is partly based on this novel.

== See also ==
- Cheaper by the Dozen (1950 film)
- Cheaper by the Dozen (2003 film)
