= Belles on Their Toes (film) =

1952 film by Henry Levin

- Theatrical release poster
- Directed by: Henry Levin
- Screenplay by: Henry Ephron; Phoebe Ephron
- Based on: Belles on Their Toes; 1950 novel by Ernestine Gilbreth Carey; Frank Bunker Gilbreth Jr.
- Produced by: Samuel G. Engel
- Starring: Myrna Loy; Jeanne Crain; Debra Paget; Jeffrey Hunter; Edward Arnold
- Cinematography: Arthur E. Arling
- Edited by: Robert Fritch
- Music by: Cyril Mockridge
- Production company: Twentieth Century-Fox
- Distributed by: Twentieth Century-Fox
- Release date: May 2, 1952 (New York)
- Running time: 89 minutes
- Country: United States
- Language: English
- Budget: $1.13 million
- Box office: $2 million

Belles on Their Toes is a 1952 American family comedy film directed by Henry Levin and starring Jeanne Crain, Myrna Loy, Debra Paget, Jeffrey Hunter and Edward Arnold. The screenplay was written by Henry Ephron and Phoebe Ephron based on the autobiographical book Belles on Their Toes (1950) by siblings Frank Bunker Gilbreth Jr. and Ernestine Gilbreth Carey. Belles on Their Toes is a sequel to the film Cheaper by the Dozen (1950), which is based on Gilbreth and Carey's eponymous 1948 book.

== Plot ==
After the death of efficiency expert Frank Gilbreth Sr., his widow Dr. Lillian Gilbreth must raise their 12 children on her own with very little money. Declining cousin Leora's proposal to disperse the children among various family members, Lillian sends her children to Nantucket, accompanied by longtime family cook and handyman Tom Bracken, while she completes her late husband's lecture tour before returning to the family home in Montclair, New Jersey.

Anne's daughter Ernestine is engaged to strapping frat boy Al Lynch. Her oldest daughter Anne meets handsome doctor Bob Grayson, whom she initially mistakes for a barber.

Sam Harper, of Harper Electric, seeks men trained by Lillian's late husband. Lillian offers to train some specifically for his company, as she and Frank had worked as a team, but Sam is uninterested before eventually changing his mind. Lillian convinces him to allow her to send six students instead of two. Sam provides four men and persuades two other companies to send a pair each. The school, located in her home, is a success.

Lillian is invited to deliver a dinner speech at the Engineers' Club of America in New York, but when she arrives, she is informed that there has been a mistake. The club did not realize that L. M. Gilbreth is a woman, and women are not permitted entry to the club. She leaves a copy of her speech, suggesting that a man deliver it. Driving home, she is so furious that she accidentally collides with a parked truck and is hospitalized. Anne is mortified to find her mother under the care of Dr. Grayson, but she and the doctor are eventually engaged.

When Lillian tells Sam about the Engineers' Club fiasco, he publicizes her achievements, but the family is horrified when he makes them the subjects of a comedic newsreel. Sam assures them that it is all good publicity. Lillian becomes a professor at Purdue University.

Grayson becomes annoyed when Anne is reluctant to leave the family or tell her mother about the engagement, as she feels that she is needed there. However, Lillian talks with Anne and convinces her that she should feel free to wed Grayson, and Anne leaves with him for a position in Detroit. That same night, Sam tries repeatedly to converse with Lillian about something, presumably his feelings for her, but they are constantly interrupted. She informs him that there is no room for anything more in her busy life, which he accepts. Lillian's youngest child graduates from college.

== Cast ==
- Myrna Loy as Dr. Lillian M. Gilbreth
- Jeanne Crain as Anne Gilbreth
- Debra Paget as Martha Gilbreth
- Jeffrey Hunter as Dr. Bob Grayson
- Edward Arnold as Sam Harper
- Hoagy Carmichael as Thomas George Bracken
- Barbara Bates as Ernestine Gilbreth
- Robert Arthur as Frank Gilbreth
- Verna Felton as Cousin Leora
- Merry Anders as Student (uncredited)
- Teddy Driver as Jack Gilbreth (uncredited)
- Jimmy Hunt as Fred Gilbreth (uncredited)
- Tommy Ivo as William Gilbreth (uncredited)
- Roddy McCaskill as Bob Gilbreth (uncredited)
- Martin Milner as Al Lynch (uncredited)
- Carol Nugent as Lillie Gilbreth (uncredited)
- Anthony Sydes as Dan Gilbreth (uncredited)
- Tina Thompson as Jane Gilbreth (uncredited)
- Clifton Webb as Frank Bunker Gilbreth (uncredited)

== Reception ==
In a contemporary review for The New York Times, critic Howard Thompson called the film "another all-American apple pie, with the same brand of wholesale and homey pleasantries that marked its predecessor" and wrote: "Samuel G. Engel's pleasantly tinted backgrounds quaintly mirror the suburban setting of Montclair, N. J., the tribe's stamping ground. And the script of Phoebe and Henry Ephron just as quaintly explores the novelty of twelve growing children and a widow who is determined to function as a full-fledged engineer. We suspect that the belles really would have been on their toes with Papa around. For without the tart-tongued earthiness of Clifton Webb, this latest chapter suggests a harmless but sentimental transcription of the Old Woman in the Shoe, played with wan bravery by Myrna Loy."
