= Annie Florence Brown =

American community leader (1873–1945)

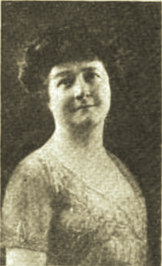
- Portrait photo from The California Alumni Monthly (1923)
- Born: February 18, 1873; Yokohama, Japan
- Died: April 9, 1945 (aged 72); Saratoga, California, U.S.
- Education: University of California, Berkeley
- Occupation: Community leader
- Known for: President: Oakland Forum; Oakland Board of Education; Alameda County Tuberculosis Association
- Relatives: Frederick William Delger (grandfather)

Annie Florence Brown (1873–1945) was an American community leader who lived in California for most of her life. In 1927, she organized the Oakland Forum, the predecessor to the League of Women Voters of Oakland, California (LWVO), and served as its President. While serving as President of the Oakland Board of Education, she was the only woman in the city holding an elected office.

== Early life and education ==
Annie Florence Brown was born on February 18, 1873, in Yokohama, Japan, in which city she spent her early childhood. Her parents were Capt. John W. and Mrs. Matilda Delger Brown. Annie's mother had become well known through her charitable work, and was president of King's Daughters' Home for Incurables in Oakland. Annie's brother, Everett J. Brown, served as Judge of the Alameda County Superior Court; other siblings included Mathilda Brown, David E. Brown, and Mrs. Richard Hardin. Frederick William Delger was her grandfather.

As a girl, she went through the Oakland grammar schools and Oakland High School, and later entered the University of California, from which institution she graduated with the degree of Bachelor of Letters (1897).

== Career ==
For a time, Brown taught grammar school; she was also an English teacher in the Oakland High School. As an adjunct to her education, she traveled broadly, making two trips to Europe and visiting the principal cities as far east as Alexandria, Egypt where she studied educational methods and social conditions.

Her foray into politics came about when the women of Oakland became anxious to be represented on the Board of Education by a woman who had an understanding of the educational needs of city's youth, and could spare the time that the responsibilities of the position demanded. Brown consented to have her name placed on the ticket, and, without any speeches or electioneering on her part, was nominated by direct primary vote and subsequently elected by a majority, serving during the period of 1911–1917. While in the role of President (1916–17), Brown was instrumental in the reorganizing of the local school department.

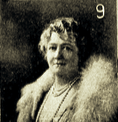
Brown in a 1928 publication.

Brown found little time for "society" in the narrow sense of the term, but was active in philanthropic work. A pioneer in public health organizations, she was the originator of the Public Health Center of Alameda County. She was an officer of the Alameda County Society for the Study and Prevention of Tuberculosis, as well as the co-founder and developer of the Alameda County Tuberculosis Association (1908), serving as President in 1922–23. Del Valle Farm, Livermore, was built for the purpose of preventing tuberculosis among children. The Annie Florence Brown Dormitory was dedicated in her honor in 1941, and three years later, she was further honored as president-emeritus.

Her appointments included section leader, United States Society (1932); and membership in the State Council of Educational Planning and Coordination.

She gave talks to children on several occasions on the interesting things she had seen in Europe and other countries.

For many years, she served on the Council of the University of California Alumni Association. She was a member of the Women's Faculty Club of the University of California, Oakland Forum, San Francisco City Club, San Francisco Town and Country Club, and the American Association of University Women.

== Personal life ==
Brown made her home Home in Oakland, California.

Ill during her last year, Annie Florence Brown died at Saratoga, California on April 9, 1945. Interment was at Mountain View Cemetery.

== Awards and honors ==
- 1927, Oakland's outstanding citizen (first woman so named)
