= Gilbreth, Inc. =

Gilbreth, Inc. was the early management consulting and industrial engineering firm of Frank Bunker Gilbreth and his wife Lillian Moller Gilbreth. It was founded as Frank B. Gilbreth, Inc., consulting engineers, in 1911. Lillian renamed it Gilbreth, Inc. after Frank's death in 1924.

The firm's methodology focused on efficiency through a "Time and Motion" approach, better known as motion studies. Its analysis and reports included reduction of effort and fatigue, with precursors to ergonomics. The resulting recommendations focused on "one best way," an approach at odds with the later quality improvement movement. The Gilbreth approach also diverged from Taylorism, another early business/work efficiency model, primarily in its consideration of human factors.

Gilbreth Inc.'s innovations were largely due to the marriage of engineering and industrial psychology reflected from its founders, who were respective experts in these fields.

In 1904 the firm moved to New York City, in 1912 to Providence, Rhode Island, and in 1919 to Montclair, New Jersey. The company continued until Lillian Gilbreth's retirement in the 1960s.
