= Edna Yost =

American author (1889–1971)

- Born: November 16, 1889; Clearfield County, Pennsylvania
- Died: September 10, 1971 (aged 81); New York, New York
- Education: Allegheny College
- Occupation: Writer
- Notable work: American Women of Science

Edna Yost (November 16, 1889, Clearfield County, Pennsylvania - September 10, 1971, New York City) wrote articles, poems, short stories, and books. She was one of the first authors to write books focusing on the achievements of women in science, such as American Women of Science (1943), American Women of Nursing (1947) and Women of Modern Science (1959). She also worked with Lillian Moller Gilbreth to research and write about ways to improve the environment for people with disabilities.

== Early life and education ==
Edna Yost was born on November 16, 1889, to Lewis and Laura Candace (Miller) Yost of Clearfield County, Pennsylvania. She grew up in Houtzdale, Pennsylvania. She received her A.B. degree from Allegheny College in 1913. She was invited to join Phi Beta Kappa and the women's fraternity Kappa Kappa Gamma and became a member of the American Association of University Women.

== Career ==
Yost taught mathematics and English at Johnstown High School in Johnstown, Pennsylvania, from 1913 to 1916. She then moved to New York City.

Yost became a member of the Woman's Press Club of New York City. She was involved in public health work for wounded servicemen. She served on the executive of the War Work Council of the Young Women's Christian Association from 1917 to 1919, and was an editorial assistant on the YWCA's Association Monthly. She worked as an editorial assistant on the American Journal of Public Health, published by the American Public Health Association, from 1919 to 1921. She also did editorial work for the American Society of Mechanical Engineers in New York from 1921 to 1925. She wrote articles for the Dictionary of American Biography as well as magazine articles, poems, short stories, and books.

She spent summers at the MacDowell Colony for creative artists in Peterborough, New Hampshire, in 1929 and 1930.

In 1944, Yost worked with Lillian Moller Gilbreth, the first woman engineering professor at Purdue University, to research and write about improving the environment for people with disabilities. Their work was directly relevant to injured servicemen returning from World War II. They published two books, Normal Lives for the Disabled' (1944) and Straight Talk to Disabled Veterans (1945). The books argued that it was possible for disabled persons to have a productive working life. Normal Lives was described as "a great help in laying a general foundation for the basic adjustment of a disabled individual". Yost also went on to write a biography of Frank and Lillian Gilbreth, efficiency experts who applied scientific management techniques to a wide variety of tasks.

Yost is best remembered for her collections of biographies, focusing on the lives of men and women in the fields of science, nursing, and technology. They were generally targeted at young people, to inspire them to work in those areas. Yost was one of the first authors to focus on writing books about the achievements of women in science. Through American Women of Science (1943), American Women of Nursing (1947) and Women of Modern Science (1959), she hoped to inspire other women with the possibilities of careers like the ones she described. She wrote that she herself had felt the lack of role models when she was a young woman, at a time when little if any biographical material was available about women.

Courtesans and female saints were the only women who, as a result of their own actions, became worthy of being written about. Queens and raving beauties decorated the pages of some of the books I read [as a child], but such women as these were born to fame. And realistic young women who read about them could never hope to emulate them for the simple reason that we had already been born without the qualifications. There were still saints and courtesans. But the saints seemed to far removed and we had been trained to believe that courtesans were wicked and did not fit well into the modern scheme of things.

Ida Tarbell reviewed American Women of Science positively for The New York Times, saying "Women who would know the best and highest of these achievements of their sex in science and the routes they took to them cannot do better than read this honest, direct and always interesting piece of work." Library Journal reviewed Women of Modern Science as "a positive contribution to the current pleas for more scientific and technical training, since it describes how some women scientists chose their life work and what they have been able to accomplish."

== Awards ==
In 1945, Yost was awarded an honorary Doctorate of Letters (Litt.D.) from Allegheny College, which she had attended.

== Death ==
Yost died September 10, 1971, in New York City.

== Bibliography ==
- Yost, Edna; McMaster, Janet (1941). Puzzle Me This. London: Oxford University Press.
- Yost, Edna (1941). Modern Americans in Science and Invention. Philadelphia: Lippincott.
- Yost, Edna (1943). American women of science. Philadelphia, New York: Frederick A. Stokes Co.
- Yost, Edna; Gilbreth, Lillian M. (1944). Normal Lives for the Disabled. New York: The Macmillan company.
- Yost, Edna; Gilbreth, Lillian M. (1945). Straight Talk to Disabled Veterans. New York: Public Affairs Commission.
- Yost, Edna (1947). American Women of Nursing. Philadelphia: Lippincott.
- Yost, Edna (1949). Frank and Lillian Gilbreth: Partners for Life. New Brunswick: Rutgers University Press.
- Yost, Edna (1952). Modern American Engineers. Philadelphia: Lippincott.
- Yost, Edna (1959). Women of modern science. New York: Dodd, Mead.
- Miller, Jr., Fred D. (1959). Yost, Edna (ed.). Open Door to Health: A Dentist Looks at Life and Nutrition. New York, NY: Devin-Adair Co.
- Yost, Edna (1961). Famous American pioneering women (Famous biographies for young people). New York: Dodd, Mead.
- Yost, Edna (1962). Modern Americans of Science and Technology. New York: Dodd, Mead.
