= Brent and Shane Kinsman =

American twin actors (born 1997)

- Born: November 13, 1997 (age 28); Los Angeles, California, U.S.
- Occupation: Actors
- Years active: 2003–2011

Brent Kinsman and Shane Kinsman (born November 13, 1997) are American twin child actors whose roles include Kyle and Nigel Baker in the 2003 film Cheaper by the Dozen and its 2005 sequel Cheaper by the Dozen 2. They also had featured roles as Porter and Preston Scavo on the popular ABC television series Desperate Housewives for four years (replaced by Charlie Carver and Max Carver from season 5).

== Filmography ==
Year	Title	Role	Notes
2003	Cheaper by the Dozen	Kyle and Nigel Baker	
2004–2008	Desperate Housewives	Porter and Preston Scavo	
2005	Cheaper by the Dozen 2	Kyle and Nigel Baker	
2008	ER	Curly and Larry Weddington	Episode: "The Book of Abby"

== Awards ==
Awards
Year	Result	Award	Category	Nominated Work
2004	Won	Young Artist Awards	Best Young Ensemble in a Feature Film	Cheaper by the Dozen
2006	Nominated	Young Artist Awards	Best Young Ensemble in a Feature Film	Cheaper by the Dozen 2
2006	Won	Screen Actors Guild Awards	Outstanding Performance by an Ensemble in a TV Series	Desperate Housewives
2007	Nominated	Screen Actors Guild Awards	Outstanding Performance by an Ensemble in a TV Series	Desperate Housewives
2008	Nominated	Screen Actors Guild Awards	Outstanding Performance by an Ensemble in a TV Series	Desperate Housewives
2009	Nominated	Screen Actors Guild Awards	Outstanding Performance by an Ensemble in a TV Series	Desperate Housewives
