= The Psychology of Management =

1914 book by Lillian Gilbreth

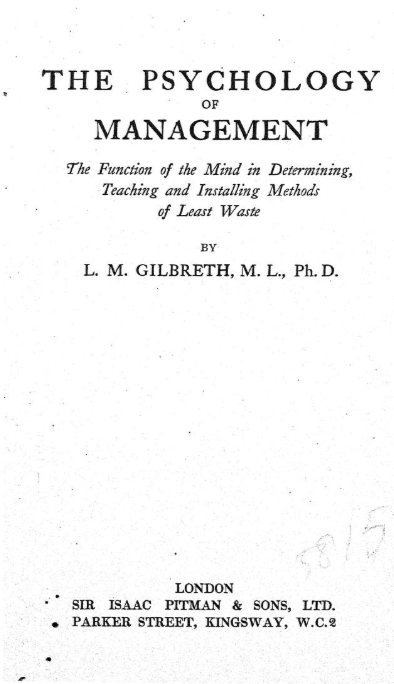
- Title page for The Psychology of Management: The Function of the Mind in Determining, Teaching, and Installing Methods of Least Waste (1914)
- Author: Lillian Gilbreth
- Genre: Non fiction
- Publication date: 1914
- ISBN: 978-1-53618-614-7

The Psychology of Management: The Function of the Mind in Determining, Teaching, and Installing Methods of Least Waste is a book written by Lillian Gilbreth which investigates the psychological aspects of scientific management, incorporating concepts of human relations and worker individuality into management principles. Published in 1914, it is a major early work in the field of industrial psychology and scientific management. A contemporary book review reflects early resistance to scientific management, stating the book "does not answer the really important questions about the effect of standardized work upon the worker".

In this book, Gilbreth defines "the psychology of management" as "the effect of the mind that is directing work upon that work which is directed, and the effect of this undirected and directed work upon the mind of the worker." She expresses the view that scientific management is "built on the principle of recognition of the individual, not only as an economic unit but as a personality", stressing the importance of including the "human element" in management, which was lacking in the prevailing form of Taylorism at the time. It was also the first time that basic elements of management theory were brought together, including "(1) knowledge of individual behavior, (2) the theory of groups, (3) the theory of communication, and (4) a rational basis for decision making".

This book was originally Gilbreth's unpublished dissertation for a doctorate from the University of California; however, since the university refused to grant her the degree due to her noncompliance with residency requirements, she instead opted to publish it. It was originally serialized during 1912-1913 in Industrial Engineering and Engineering Digest, before it was published in book form in 1914.
