= Blake Woodruff =

American actor (born 1995)

- Born: Benjamin Blake Woodruff; June 19, 1995 (age 31); Flagstaff, Arizona, U.S.
- Occupation: Actor
- Years active: 2003–2017

Benjamin Blake Woodruff (born June 19, 1995) is an American child actor.

== Career ==
Woodruff began his acting career playing the role of the crying boy in the 2003 thriller Blind Horizon. Further more, he played Mike Baker in the 2003 film Cheaper by the Dozen. In 2004, he played Danny Pope in Mister Ed. From 2004-2005, he played Noah Newman in 5 episodes of The Young and the Restless. In 2005, he played Jake Martin in Back to You and Me. The same year, he reprised his role as Mike Baker in Cheaper by the Dozen 2. In 2007, he played David in Whisper. He later began working as a stunt performer, and he now works as a real estate agent in California.

== Filmography ==
Year	Title	Role	Notes
2003	Blind Horizon	Crying Boy	Uncredited
2003	Cheaper by the Dozen	Mike Baker	
2004	Mr. Ed	Danny Pope	
2004-2005	The Young and the Restless	Noah Newman	5 Episodes
2005	Back to You and Me	Jake Martin	
2005	Cheaper by the Dozen 2	Mike Baker	
2007	Whisper	David Sandborn	
2017	Victor Crowley	Zach	

== Awards ==
Year	Award	Category	Film	Result
2004	Young Artist Awards	Best Young Ensemble in a Feature Film	Cheaper by the Dozen	Won
2006	Young Artist Award	Best Young Ensemble in a Feature Film	Cheaper by the Dozen 2	Nominated
