= Lillian Moller Gilbreth =

American psychologist and industrial engineer

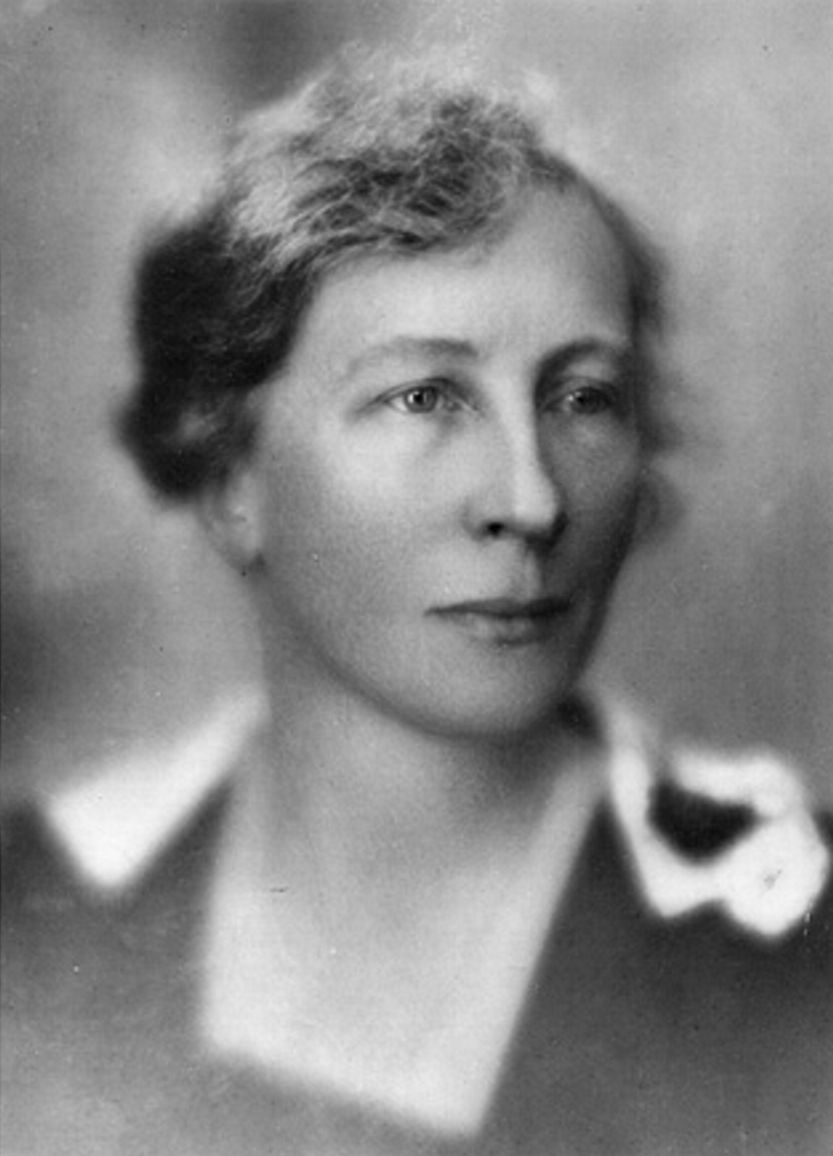
- Gilbreth in 1921
- Born: Lillian Evelyn Moller; May 24, 1878; Oakland, California, U.S.
- Died: January 2, 1972 (aged 93); Phoenix, Arizona, U.S.
- Education: University of California, Berkeley; Brown University
- Occupations: Industrial psychologist Ergonomics expert Management consultant Professor
- Known for: Seminal contributions to human factors engineering and ergonomics; Therblig
- Spouse: Frank Bunker Gilbreth (m. 1904; died 1924)
- Children: 12, including Ernestine, Frank Jr., and Robert
- Relatives: Frederick Delger (maternal grandfather)
- Awards: Fellow, National Academy of Kinesiology (elected 1955); National Academy of Engineering (elected 1965); Hoover Medal (1966)

Lillian Evelyn Gilbreth (née Moller; May 24, 1878 – January 2, 1972) was an American psychologist, industrial engineer, consultant, and educator who was an early pioneer in applying psychology to time-and-motion studies. She was described in the 1940s as "a genius in the art of living."

Gilbreth, one of the first female engineers to earn a Ph.D., is considered to be the first industrial/organizational psychologist. She and her husband, Frank Bunker Gilbreth, were efficiency experts who contributed to the study of industrial engineering, especially in the areas of motion study and human factors.

Cheaper by the Dozen (1948) and Belles on Their Toes (1950), written by two of their children (Ernestine and Frank Jr.) tell the story of their family life and describe how time-and-motion studies were applied to the organization and daily activities of their large family. Both books were later made into feature films.

== Early life and education ==
Lillie Evelyn Moller was born in Oakland, California, on May 24, 1878, to Annie (née Delger) and William Moller, a builder's supply merchant. She was their second child and the eldest of the family's nine surviving children. Their first child, Anna Adelaide, had died at age four months. Her maternal grandfather Frederick Delger was a German immigrant who became the richest man in Oakland.

Educated at home until the age of nine, Moller began formal schooling in the first grade at a public elementary school and was rapidly promoted through the grade levels. She was elected vice president of her senior class at Oakland High School and graduated with exemplary grades in May 1896.

Although Moller wanted to go to college, her father was opposed to such education for his daughters, but she persuaded her father to let her try college for a year and was admitted to the University of California. After her first-year grades were near the top of her class, her father agreed to allow her to continue her studies. She commuted from home on the streetcar, and in the evenings helped her mother with the household and her siblings with their homework. She majored in English, also studying philosophy and psychology, and had enough education courses to earn a teaching certificate. She also won a prize for poetry and acted in student plays. In the spring of her senior year the new university president, Benjamin Ide Wheeler, asked her to be one of the student speakers at the commencement ceremonies. On May 16, 1900, she graduated from the university and became the first woman to speak at a University of California commencement. The title of her speech was "Life: A Means or an End".

Moller had begun to think of a professional career rather than staying at home after graduation. She now wished to be called Lillian because she felt it was a more dignified name for a university graduate, and she left home to enroll in graduate school at Columbia University in New York City. Her literature professor Charles Gayley had suggested she study there with Brander Matthews. Graduate enrollment at Columbia was almost half women at the time, but Matthews would not allow them in his classes. Instead, she studied literature with George Edward Woodberry. A lasting influence was her study with the psychologist Edward Thorndike, newly appointed at Columbia. Though she became ill with pleurisy and was brought home by her father, she continued to refer to Thorndike in her later work. Back in California, she returned to the University of California in August 1901 to work toward a master's degree in literature. Under the supervision of Gayley, she wrote a thesis on Ben Jonson's play Bartholomew Fair, and received her master's degree in the spring of 1902.

Moller began studies for a PhD at the University of California, but took time off to travel through Europe in the spring of 1903. Following her marriage to Frank Bunker Gilbreth in 1904 and relocation to New York, she completed a dissertation for a doctorate from the University of California, Berkeley, in 1911, but was not awarded the degree due to her noncompliance with residency requirements for doctoral candidates. The dissertation was published as The Psychology of Management: The Function of the Mind in Determining, Teaching and Installing Methods of Least Waste in 1914.

After the Gilbreths relocated their family to Providence, Rhode Island, Lillian enrolled at Brown University. She earned a Ph.D. in applied psychology in 1915, making her the first of the pioneers of industrial management to have a doctorate. The topic of her dissertation was efficient teaching methods and titled Some Aspects of Eliminating Waste in Teaching. Her doctoral dissertation was published in 2019 as a book titled Eliminating Waste in Teaching (ISBN 978-1-7320191-0-2).

== Marriage and family ==
Lillian Moller met Frank Bunker Gilbreth in June 1903 in Boston, Massachusetts, en route to Europe with her chaperone, who was Frank's cousin. He had apprenticed in several building trades in the East and established a contracting business with offices in Boston, New York, and London.

The couple married on October 19, 1904, in Oakland, California, and settled in New York. They later moved to Providence, Rhode Island, and eventually relocated their family to Montclair, New Jersey.

As planned, the Gilbreths became the parents of a large family that included twelve children. One died young in 1912; one was still-born in 1915; and eleven of them lived to adulthood, including Ernestine Gilbreth, Frank Bunker Gilbreth Jr., and Robert Moller Gilbreth.

After Frank died of a heart attack on June 14, 1924, Lillian never remarried.

== Career ==
For just under 50 years, Gilbreth's career combined psychology with the study of scientific management and engineering. She also included her perspectives as a wife and mother in her research, writing, and consulting work. Gilbreth became a pioneer in what is now known as industrial and organizational psychology. She helped industrial engineers recognize the importance of the psychological dimensions of work. In addition, she became the first American engineer ever to create a synthesis of psychology and scientific management. (Gilbreth introduced the concept of using psychology to study management at the Dartmouth College Conference on Scientific Management in 1911).

In addition to jointly running Gilbreth, Incorporated, their business and engineering consulting firm, Lillian and Frank wrote numerous publications as sole authors, as well as co-authoring multiple books and more than fifty papers on a variety of scientific topics. However, in their joint publications, Lillian was not always named as a co-author, possibly due to publishers' concerns about naming a female writer. Although her credentials included a doctorate in psychology, she was less frequently credited in their joint publications than her husband, who did not attend college.

The Gilbreths were certain that the revolutionary ideas of Frederick Winslow Taylor would be neither easy to implement nor sufficient; their implementation would require hard work by engineers and psychologists to make them successful. The Gilbreths also believed that scientific management as formulated by Taylor fell short when it came to managing the human element on the shop floor. The Gilbreths helped formulate a constructive critique of Taylorism; this critique had the support of other successful managers.

In 1934, Gilbreth organized the energy-saving kitchen, along with the nursery and the clothery for America's Little House. Designed by architect, Roger Bullard, it was a project from Better Homes in America for a two-story suburban type home to be situated in New York City on Park Avenue and 39th Street, amongst all the skyscrapers.

After Frank's passing and the mourning period, Lillian found that the homages to her husband were not a sign of her own taking, when three of her biggest clients did not renew or cancelled contracts. Close associates offered her employment in their firms, but she wanted to keep Frank's business afloat.

=== Time, motion, and fatigue study ===
Gilbreth and her husband were equal partners in the engineering and management consulting firm of Gilbreth, Incorporated. She continued to lead the company for decades after his death in 1924. The Gilbreths, both pioneers in scientific management, were especially adept at performing time-and-motion studies. They named their methodology the Gilbreth System and used the slogan, "The One Best Way to Do Work," to promote it. The Gilbreths also developed a new technique for their studies that used a motion-picture camera to record work processes. These filmed observations enabled the Gilbreths to redesign machinery to better suit workers' movements to improve efficiency and reduce fatigue. Their research on fatigue study was a forerunner to ergonomics. In addition, the Gilbreths applied a human approach to scientific management to develop innovations in workplace efficiency, such as improved lighting and regular breaks, as well as ideas for workplace psychological well-being, such as suggestion boxes and free books.

=== Domestic management and home economics ===
Gilbreth collaborated with her husband until his death in 1924. Afterwards, she continued to research, write, and teach, in addition to consulting with businesses and manufacturers. She also participated in professional organizations such as the American Society of Mechanical Engineers until her own death nearly fifty years later in 1972. In addition, Gilbreth turned her attention to the home, despite her aversion to housework and the fact that she had long employed full-time household help. Her children once described her kitchen as a "model of inefficiency."

Due to discrimination within the engineering community, Gilbreth shifted her efforts toward research projects in the female-friendly arena of domestic management and home economics. She applied the principles of scientific management to household tasks and "sought to provide women with shorter, simpler, and easier ways of doing housework to enable them to seek paid employment outside the home." The Gilbreth children often took part in the experiments.

In addition, Gilbreth was instrumental in the development of the modern kitchen, creating the "work triangle" and linear-kitchen layouts that are often used today. In the late 1920s, she collaborated with Mary E. Dillon, president of Brooklyn Borough Gas Company on the creation of an efficient kitchen, equipped with gas-powered appliances and named the Kitchen Practical. Inspired by Dillon's criticisms of her own kitchen, it was designed on three principles: the correct and uniform height of working surfaces; a circular work place; and a general "circular routing of working", all carefully analyzed to reduce the time and effort required in the preparation of meals. It was unveiled in 1929 at a Women's Exposition.

She is also credited with the invention of the foot-pedal trash can, adding shelves to the inside of refrigerator doors (including the butter tray and egg keeper), and wall-light switches, all now standard. Gilbreth filed numerous patents for her designs, including one to improve the electric can-opener and another for a wastewater hose for washing machines. When Gilbreth was an industrial engineer working at General Electric, she "interviewed over 4,000 women to design the proper height for stoves, sinks, and other kitchen fixtures as she worked on improving kitchen designs".

After World War I, the Gilbreths did pioneering work with the rehabilitation of war-veteran amputees. Lillian continued consulting with businesses and manufacturers after Frank's death. Her clients included Johnson & Johnson and Macy's, among others. Lillian spent three years at Macy's to find solutions to their sales and human-resource issues. Solutions included changing light fixtures to reduce eye fatigue and eliminating duplicate recordings of sales checks.

In 1926, when Johnson & Johnson hired her as a consultant to do marketing research on sanitary napkins, Gilbreth and the firm benefited in three ways. First, Johnson & Johnson could use her training as a psychologist in the measurement and analysis of attitudes and opinions. Second, it could give her experience as an engineer specializing in the interaction between bodies and material objects. Third, her public image as a mother and a modern career woman could help the firm build consumer trust in its products. In addition to her work with Johnson & Johnson, Gilbreth was instrumental in the design of a desk in cooperation with IBM for display at the Chicago World's Fair in 1933

=== Volunteer work and government service ===
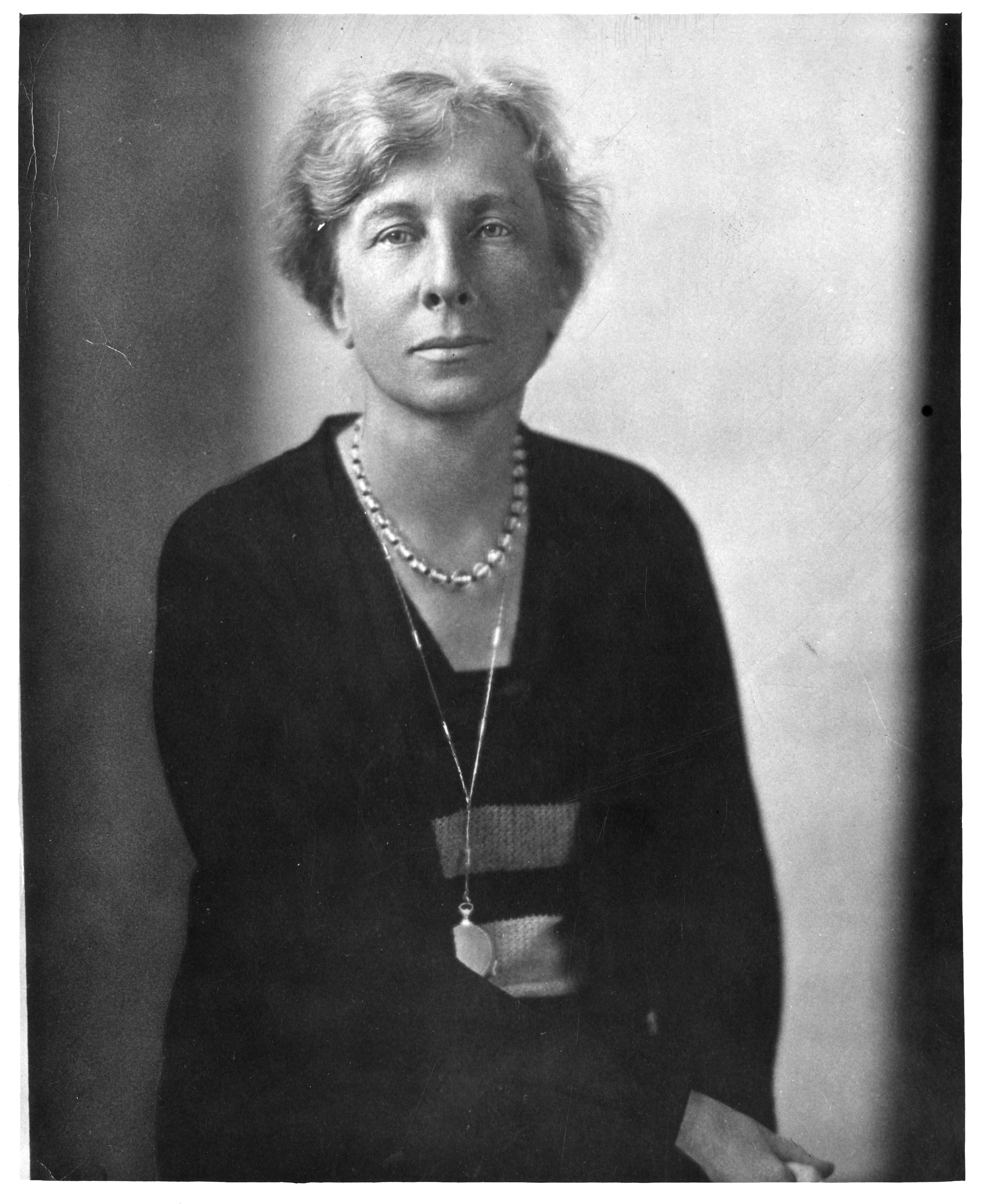
Gilbreth during the Great Depression

Gilbreth continued her private consulting practice while serving as a volunteer and an adviser to several government agencies and nonprofit groups. In 1927 she became a charter member of the Altrusa Club of New York City, an organization for Professional and Business Women started in 1917 for the purpose of providing community service. Gilbreth's government work began as a result of her longtime friendship with Herbert Hoover and his wife Lou Henry Hoover, both of whom she had known in California (Gilbreth had presided over the Women's Branch of the Engineers' Hoover for President campaign).

Lou Hoover urged Gilbreth to join the Girl Scouts as a consultant in 1929. She remained active in the organization for more than twenty years, becoming a member of its board of directors. During the Great Depression, President Hoover appointed Gilbreth to the Organization on Unemployment Relief as head of the "Share the Work" program. In 1930, under the Hoover administration, she headed the women's section of the President's Emergency Committee for Employment and helped to gain the cooperation of women's groups for reducing unemployment. During World War II Gilbreth continued advising governmental groups and also provided expertise on education and labor issues (especially women in the workforce) for organizations such as the War Manpower Commission, the Office of War Information, and the U.S. Navy. In her later years, Gilbreth served on the Chemical Warfare Board and on Harry Truman's Civil Defense Advisory Council. During the Korean War she served on the Defense Advisory Committee on Women in the Services.

=== Author and educator ===
Gilbreth had a lifelong interest in teaching and education. As an undergraduate at the University of California, Berkeley, she took enough education courses to earn a teacher's certificate, and her doctoral dissertation at Brown University was on applying the principles of scientific management to secondary school teaching.

While residing in Providence, Rhode Island, Gilbreth and her husband taught free, two-week-long summer schools in scientific management from 1913 to 1916. The Gilbreths also discussed teaching the Gilbreth System of time-and-motion study to members of industry, but it was not until after her husband's death in 1924 that she created a formal motion-study course. Gilbreth presented this idea at the First Prague International Management Congress in Prague in July 1924. Her first course began in January 1925. Gilbreth's classes offered to "prepare a member of an organization, who has adequate training both in scientific method and in plant problems, to take charge of Motion Study work in that organization." Coursework included laboratory projects and field trips to private firms to witness the application of scientific management. She ran a total of seven motion-study courses out of her home in Montclair, New Jersey until 1930.

To earn additional income to support her large family, Gilbreth delivered numerous addresses to business and industry gatherings, as well as on college and university campuses such as Harvard; Yale; Colgate; the University of Michigan; MIT; Stanford; and Purdue University. In 1925 she succeeded her husband as a visiting lecturer at Purdue, where he had been delivering annual lectures. In 1935 she became a professor of management at Purdue's School of Mechanical Engineering, and the country's first female engineering professor. She was promoted to a full professor at Purdue in 1940. Gilbreth divided her time between Purdue's departments of industrial engineering, industrial psychology, home economics, and the dean's office, where she consulted on careers for women. Gilbreth lived in Women's Residence Hall South, now Duhme Hall, part of Windsor Halls on Purdue University's campus.

In cooperation with Marvin Mundel, Gilbreth established and supervised a time-and-motion-study laboratory at Purdue's School of Industrial Engineering. She also demonstrated how time-and-motion studies could be used in agricultural studies and later transferred motion-study techniques to the home economics department under the banner of "work simplification". Gilbreth retired from Purdue's faculty in 1948..

After Gilbreth's retirement from Purdue, she continued to travel and deliver lectures. She also taught at several other colleges and universities, and became head of the Newark College of Engineering in 1941. Gilbreth was appointed the Knapp Visiting Professor at the University of Wisconsin's School of Engineering in 1955. She also taught at Bryn Mawr College and Rutgers University. Whilst teaching at Bryn Mawr, she met then student of social economy, Anne Gillespie Shaw, who later worked for Gilbreth Management Consultants, doing commercial research studies and became a lifelong friend and colleague. In 1964, at the age of eighty-six, Gilbreth became resident lecturer at Massachusetts Institute of Technology. In 1968, when her health began to fail, Gilbreth retired from her active public life and eventually entered a nursing home.

== Death and legacy ==
Gilbreth died of a stroke on January 2, 1972, in Phoenix, Arizona, at the age of ninety-three. Her ashes were scattered at sea.

Gilbreth was best known for her work as an industrial engineer and a pioneer in the field of management theory. Dubbed "America's first lady of engineering," she brought her training in psychology to time-and-motion studies and demonstrated how companies and industries could improve their management techniques, efficiency, and productivity. Gilbreth's extensive research and writings on her own and in collaboration with her husband emphasized "the human element in scientific management." Her expertise and major contribution to the field of scientific management was integrating the psychological and mental processes with the time-and-motion studies. She also helped make these types of studies widely accepted. In addition, Gilbreth was among the first to establish industrial engineering curricula in college and university engineering schools. Gilbreth's book, The Psychology of Management (1914), was an early major work in the history of engineering thought and the first to combine psychology with elements of management theory. Major repositories of Gilbreth materials are at the Archives Center of the Smithsonian National Museum of American History in Washington, D.C., and at Purdue University Library, Archives and Special Collections, at West Lafayette, Indiana.

Gilbreth also made contributions on behalf of women. Her pioneering work in industrial engineering influenced women in the field. In addition to her lectures on various engineering topics, she encouraged women to study industrial engineering and management. Purdue awarded its first PhD in engineering to a woman in 1950, two years after Gilbreth retired from the university.

Several engineering awards have been named in Gilbreth's honor. The National Academy of Engineering established the Lillian M. Gilbreth Lectureships in 2001 to recognize outstanding young American engineers. The highest honor bestowed by the Institute of Industrial Engineers is the Frank and Lillian Gilbreth Industrial Engineering Award for "those who have distinguished themselves through contributions to the welfare of mankind in the field of industrial engineering". The Lillian M. Gilbreth Distinguished Professor award at Purdue University is bestowed on a member of the industrial engineering department. The Society of Women Engineers awards the Lillian Moller Gilbreth Memorial Scholarship to female engineering undergraduates.

Two of the Gilbreth children also paid tribute to their mother in books about their family life. Cheaper by the Dozen (1948), a bestseller by Gilbreth's son, Frank Jr., and daughter, Ernestine, was made into a motion picture in 1950 starring Myrna Loy as Lillian and Clifton Webb as Frank. The book's sequel, Belles on Their Toes (1950), also written by Frank Jr. and Ernestine, was made into a motion picture sequel in 1952. Frank Jr. also paid tribute to his mother in Time Out for Happiness (1972).

In 1962, the Industrial Engineering building at the University of Rhode Island that was built the previous year was dedicated to Lillian and her spouse Frank Bunker Gilbreth for their pioneering work in industrial engineering.

In 2018, the College of Engineering at Purdue University established the prestigious Lillian Gilbreth Postdoctoral Fellowship Program to attract and prepare outstanding individuals with recently awarded Ph.D.s for a career in engineering academia through interdisciplinary research, training, and professional development.

== Awards and honors ==
Gilbreth received numerous awards and honors for her contributions.

- Gilbreth is the recipient of twenty-three honorary degrees from schools such as Rutgers University, Princeton University, Brown University, Smith College, and the University of Michigan.
- Her portrait hangs in the National Portrait Gallery.
- The Gilbreth Engineering Library at Purdue University is named in honor of Lillian and Frank Gilbreth.
- In 1921, Lillian Gilbreth was the second person to be named an honorary member of the American Society of Industrial Engineers.
- She joined the British Women's Engineering Society in 1924.
- Gilbreth was accepted to the membership of the American Society of Mechanical Engineers in 1926, becoming its second female member.
- In 1931 she received the first Gilbreth Medal, which was initiated in honor of her late husband.
- In 1941 the Purdue University chapter of Mortar Board, a national honor society, named Gilbreth an honorary member.
- In 1944 the American Society of Mechanical Engineers awarded Gilbreth and her husband (posthumously) the Henry Laurence Gantt Medal for their contributions to industrial engineering.
- In 1950 Gilbreth became the first honorary member of the newly created Society of Women Engineers.
- In 1951 she was awarded the Wallace Clark Award.
- The University of California's alumni association named Gilbreth the 1954 Alumna of the Year.
- In 1955 she was inducted as an Associate Fellow in the prestigious National Academy of Kinesiology (formerly American Academy of Physical Education; American Academy of Kinesiology and Physical Education).
- In 1965 Gilbreth became the first woman elected to the National Academy of Engineering.
- In 1966 Gilbreth became the first woman to receive the Hoover Medal. (Note: The Hoover Medal, an engineering prize awarded jointly by five engineering societies, was awarded to Gilbreth for her "contributions to motion study and to the recognition of the principle that management engineering and human relations are intertwined" and "her unselfish application of energy and creative efforts in modifying industrial and home environments for the handicapped has resulted in full employment of their capabilities and elevation of their self-esteem".)
- She was made an honorary Member of the British Women's Engineering Society in 1967.
- Gilbreth was a recipient of Gold Medal award from the US National Institute of Social Sciences.
- In 1984 the U.S. Postal Service issued a 40-cent Great Americans series postage stamp in Gilbreth's honor, (Note: Although the American Psychological Association identified Gilbreth as the first psychologist to be so commemorated, psychologists Dr. Gary Brucato and Dr. John D. Hogan later questioned this claim, noting that John Dewey had appeared on an American stamp in 1968, seventeen years earlier; however, Brocato and Hogan also emphasized that Gilbreth was the first female psychologist to be so honored. A comprehensive international list of psychologists on stamps (compiled by psychology historian Ludy T. Benjamin) indicates that Gilbreth was the second female psychologist commemorated by a postage stamp in all the world, preceded only by Maria Montessori in India in 1970.)
- In 1995, Gilbreth was inducted into the US National Women's Hall of Fame.

== Selected published works ==
- A Primer of Scientific Management (1912), co-authored with Frank B. Gilbreth
- The Psychology of Management: the Function of the Mind in Determining, Teaching and Installing Methods of Least Waste (1914)
- Motion Models (1915) with Frank B. Gilbreth
- Fatigue Study: The Elimination of Humanity's Greatest Unnecessary Waste; a First Step in Motion Study] (1916) with Frank B. Gilbreth
- Applied Motion Study; A collection of papers on the efficient method to industrial preparedness. (1917) with Frank B. Gilbreth
- Motion Study for the Handicapped (1920) with Frank B. Gilbreth
- The Quest of the One Best Way: A Sketch of the Life of Frank Bunker Gilbreth (1925)
- The Home-maker and Her Job (1927)
- Living With Our Children (1928)
- The Foreman in Manpower Management (1947), with Alice Rice Cook
- Normal Lives for the Disabled (1948), with Edna Yost
- Management in the Home: Happier Living Through Saving Time and Energy (1954), with Orpha Mae Thomas and Eleanor Clymer
- As I Remember: An Autobiography (1998), published posthumously
