= Cheaper by the Dozen (2003 film) =

2003 film by Shawn Levy

- Theatrical release poster
- Directed by: Shawn Levy
- Screenplay by: Sam Harper; Joel Cohen; Alec Sokolow
- Story by: Craig Titley
- Based on: Cheaper by the Dozen; 1948 book by: Frank Bunker Gilbreth Jr.; Ernestine Gilbreth Carey
- Produced by: Robert Simonds; Michael Barnathan; Ben Myron
- Starring: Steve Martin; Bonnie Hunt; Hilary Duff; Tom Welling; Piper Perabo
- Cinematography: Jonathan Brown
- Edited by: George Folsey Jr.
- Music by: Christophe Beck
- Production companies: 20th Century Fox; Robert Simonds Productions
- Distributed by: 20th Century Fox
- Release date: December 25, 2003
- Running time: 99 minutes
- Country: United States
- Language: English
- Budget: $40 million
- Box office: $190.5 million

Cheaper by the Dozen is a 2003 American comedy film directed by Shawn Levy. It is a remake of the 1950 film of the same name. Both films were inspired by the semi-autobiographical book Cheaper by the Dozen by Frank Bunker Gilbreth Jr. and his sister Ernestine Gilbreth Carey. It stars Steve Martin, Bonnie Hunt, Hilary Duff, Tom Welling, and Piper Perabo, alongside Kevin G. Schmidt, Alyson Stoner, Jacob Smith, Forrest Landis, Liliana Mumy, Morgan York, Blake Woodruff, Brent and Shane Kinsman, Paula Marshall, and Alan Ruck in supporting roles. Outside of a passing mention of the Gilbreth name, the film has little connection with the original source material.

The film was released on December 25, 2003, by 20th Century Fox, and grossed $190 million worldwide against a $40 million budget, despite mixed-to-negative reviews from critics.

A sequel, Cheaper by the Dozen 2, was released in 2005. A remake was released in 2022 on Disney+.

== Plot ==
Tom Baker is a football coach working at a small rural college in the fictional town of Midland, Illinois, where he raised twelve children. His wife, Kate, has written about her story in a book and hopes to send it to her friend for publication. One day, Tom receives an offer from his old friend and football teammate, Shake McGuire, to coach at his alma mater in Evanston, Illinois. Tom accepts the offer, and he demands all the children vote on moving. Despite losing the vote, Tom has the entire family to move to Evanston for a better home and space. The atmosphere at the Bakers' new house is tense and the situation at school is even worse.

When her book is ready to pick up for publication, Kate is strongly required to do a national book tour to promote it. While Kate is away, Tom thinks that he can handle everything in the family's household, so he decides to hire the family's oldest child, Nora, and her self-absorbed boyfriend, Hank, to manage the children. When Nora and Hank arrive, the younger children plan to make Hank the target of their prank by soaking his underwear in raw meat and siccing the Bakers' pet dog on him to bite his buttocks, prompting him to refuse to assist in babysitting. As a result, Nora angrily drives off with Hank, while Tom lectures them for their prank.

After Kate departs for her book tour, Tom realizes that he cannot handle the children on his own after a chaotic night. He tries to hire a housekeeper, but nobody is willing to work with a family as large as the Bakers. Tom decides to bring the football players from work into his house for game practicing in the living room to prepare for the Saturday night football game, while the children perform chores and their household games. However, they start causing trouble at school and Charlie, the Bakers' oldest son, is removed from the football team.

Kate overhears from the children about the chaos and cancels the remainder of her book tour to take charge of the situation. Kate's publisher decides to create an additional promotion for her book by inviting Oprah Winfrey to tape a segment about the Bakers in their home instead. Despite much coaching from Kate, the Bakers are not able to demonstrate the loving, strongly bonded family that Kate described in her book. However, when Mark becomes upset that his pet frog has died, a heated fight erupts moments before the segment starts, leading the cameramen to call Winfrey to cancel the segment. Mark runs away from home, prompting the Bakers to find him, with Nora dumping Hank when he refuses to help. Tom indulges a hunch that Mark is trying to return to the Bakers' old home, and eventually finds Mark on an Amtrak train en route from Chicago to Midland.

Reuniting with the rest of their family, the Bakers begin to address their issues with each other, and find a happy medium. Kate publishes her book and becomes successful in sales. Tom ultimately resigns from his position at his alma mater and finds another job, which allows him to spend more time caring for his family.

== Cast ==
=== Baker family ===
- Steve Martin as Tom Baker, the patriarch of the Baker family
- Bonnie Hunt as Kate Baker, the matriarch of the Baker family who is the narrator of the film
- Piper Perabo as Nora Baker, the eldest Baker child
- Tom Welling as Charlie Baker, the second Baker child
- Hilary Duff as Lorraine Baker, the third Baker child
- Kevin G. Schmidt as Henry Baker, the fourth Baker child
- Alyson Stoner as Sarah Baker, the fifth Baker child
- Jacob Smith as Jake Baker, the sixth Baker child
- Forrest Landis as Mark Baker, the seventh Baker child
- Liliana Mumy and Morgan York as Jessica and Kim Baker, the eighth and ninth Baker children and fraternal twin sisters
- Blake Woodruff as Mike Baker, the tenth Baker child
- Brent and Shane Kinsman as Nigel and Kyle Baker, the youngest Baker children and identical twin brothers

=== Others ===
- Ashton Kutcher as Hank, Nora’s boyfriend
- Paula Marshall as Tina Shenk, the neighbor of the Bakers
- Alan Ruck as Bill Shenk, Tina's husband
- Steven Anthony Lawrence as Dylan Shenk, Tina & Bill's son
- Richard Jenkins as Shake McGuire, Tom's friend and boss
- Vanessa Bell Calloway as Diane Phillips, Kate's publisher
- Tiffany Dupont as Beth, Charlie's girlfriend
- Cody Linley as Quinn
- Dax Shepard as Camera Crew Member
- Amy Hill as Miss Hozzie, Nigel and Kyle's kindergarten teacher
- Shawn Levy as a reporter
- Jared Padalecki as a bully who causes problems for Charlie
- Wayne Knight as Pete, the electrician whose repairs on the Bakers' chandelier in the hallway cause him to fall off of his ladder in two different incidents.
- Regis Philbin as himself
- Kelly Ripa as herself

== Soundtrack ==
No official soundtrack was ever released. These are the songs contained in the film:

"Cheaper by the Dozen" Soundtrack
No.	Title	Writer(s)	Performed by	Length
1.	"I'm Just a Kid"	Simple Plan	Simple Plan	1:24
2.	"Help!"	Lennon–McCartney	Fountains of Wayne	1:12
3.	"In Too Deep"	Sum 41	Sum 41	2:46
4.	"What Christmas Should Be"	Hilary Duff	Hilary Duff	3:10
5.	"Life Is a Highway"	Tom Cochrane	Tom Cochrane	4:26
6.	"These Are Days"	10,000 Maniacs	10,000 Maniacs	3:39
7.	"Rockin' Robin"	Leon René	Michael Jackson	2:33
8.	"Rockin' Around the Christmas Tree"	Johnny Marks	Brenda Lee	2:06
Total length:				21:16

Other compositions that were used in the film are "Classical Gas" by Mason Williams and Carl Orff's "O Fortuna", among others.

== Reception ==
=== Critical response ===
On the review aggregator website Rotten Tomatoes, 25% of 118 critics' reviews are positive. The website's consensus reads: "In this family of twelve children, much chaos ensues, but little hilarity." Metacritic, which uses a weighted average, assigned the film a score of 46 out of 100, based on 30 critics, indicating "mixed or average" reviews. Audiences polled by CinemaScore gave the film an A− grade.

Despite this, the film was given "Two Thumbs Up" from Roger Ebert and Richard Roeper on their television show. Ebert in his review for the Chicago Sun-Times gave the film 3 out of 4 stars and called it "lighthearted fun".

Robert Koehler of Variety was critical of the uneven tone of the film, varying between "schmaltzy/gooey and slapstick/gross-out" and wrote that it was "as far from the original pic and its autobiographical memoir source as it can be while retaining the same title" but predicted a wide-ranging audience for the film.

=== Box office ===
The film ranked at #2 for the weekend, grossing $27,557,647 in its opening weekend ($35,397,241 including its Thursday Christmas Day gross of $7,839,594) from 3,298 theaters for an average of $8,356 per theater ($10,733 average per theater over four days), being kept from the top spot by The Lord of the Rings: The Return of the King. The film went on to gross $138,614,544 in North America, and an additional $51,597,569 internationally, for a total gross of $190,212,113 worldwide, nearly five times its $40 million budget.

=== Accolades ===
Ashton Kutcher was nominated for a Golden Raspberry Award for Worst Actor for his performance in this film, Just Married and My Boss's Daughter, but he lost to Ben Affleck with Daredevil, Gigli and Paycheck.

Association	Category	Recipients	Result	Ref.
Kids' Choice Awards	Favorite Male Movie Star	Ashton Kutcher	Nominated	
Teen Choice Awards	Choice Movie: Blush	Hilary Duff	Nominated	
Teen Choice Awards	Choice Breakout Movie Star – Male	Tom Welling	Nominated	
Teen Choice Awards	Choice Movie Liplock	Piper Perabo and Ashton Kutcher	Nominated	
Young Artist Awards	Best Young Ensemble Cast	Cast (under 18)	Won	
Young Artist Awards	Best Young Actor Age Ten or Younger	Forrest Landis	Won	
Young Artist Awards	Best Young Actress Age Ten or Younger	Alyson Stoner	Nominated	

== Home media ==
Cheaper by the Dozen was released on VHS and DVD on April 6, 2004, by 20th Century Fox Home Entertainment.
