= Frank Bunker Gilbreth Jr. =

American journalist and author (1911–2001)

Frank Bunker Gilbreth, Jr.
- Born: March 17, 1911; Plainfield, New Jersey
- Died: February 18, 2001 (aged 89); Charleston, South Carolina
- Education: University of Michigan
- Parent(s): Frank Bunker Gilbreth; Lillian Evelyn Moller
- Relatives: Ernestine Gilbreth Carey, (sister); Robert Moller Gilbreth, (brother)

Frank Bunker Gilbreth Jr. (March 17, 1911 – February 18, 2001) was an American journalist and author. He co-authored, with his sister Ernestine, the autobiographical bestsellers Cheaper by the Dozen (1948; which was adapted as a 1950 film) and Belles on Their Toes (1950; which was adapted as a 1952 film). Under his own name, he wrote multiple additional books, such as Time Out for Happiness and Ancestors of the Dozen, and a long-running newspaper column.

== Early life and education ==
Gilbreth was born in Plainfield, New Jersey, the fifth child (and first boy) of the 12 children born to efficiency experts Frank Bunker Gilbreth and Lillian Moller Gilbreth, and grew up in the family home in Montclair, New Jersey, where he attended Montclair High School. Gilbreth graduated from the University of Michigan, where he served as editor of the college newspaper, The Michigan Daily.

== Career ==
During World War II, he served as a naval officer in the South Pacific, participated in three invasions in the Admiralty Islands and the Philippines, and was decorated with two air medals and a bronze star.

In 1947, he relocated to Charleston, South Carolina, where he returned to The Post and Courier (the city's main daily newspaper), as an editorial writer and columnist; under the nom de plume of Ashley Cooper, he wrote a long-running column, Doing the Charleston, which ran until 1993. He retired from The Post and Courier in 2001, as assistant publisher and vice president.

He and his older sister, Ernestine, wrote the bestselling books Cheaper by the Dozen (1948; adapted as a 1950 film) and its sequel Belles on Their Toes (1950; adapted as a 1952 film), which were largely autobiographical. On his own, he also wrote about fatherhood in the post-World War II "baby boom", and about family members.

== Personal life ==
Gilbreth was married twice, to Elizabeth Cauthen (until her death in 1954), with whom he had a daughter (Elizabeth G. Cantler), and then to Mary Pringle Manigault (1955–2001), with whom he had two children (Dr. Edward M. Gilbreth and Rebecca G. Herres).

== Death ==
Gilbreth died in 2001, aged 89, in Charleston, South Carolina, where he had lived for the preceding half century. At the time, he also maintained the family home in Nantucket, Massachusetts, which his father had bought in 1921.

== Works ==
=== Novels ===
Cheaper by the Dozen series (with Ernestine Gilbreth Carey):

1. Cheaper by the Dozen (1st ed.). Thomas Y. Crowell. 1948. ASIN B001ACNZYK.
2. Belles on Their Toes (1st ed.). Thomas Y. Crowell. 1950. ASIN B0007F54BI.

Stand-alones:

- Held's Angels, with John Held (illustrator), 1952
- Loblolly, 1959
- He's My Boy, 1962

=== Non-fiction ===
Articles

- Ashley Cooper's Doing the Charleston, 1993, collection of articles, ISBN 9994088645

Autobiographies and memoirs

- I'm a Lucky Guy, 1951
- Innside Nantucket, 1954
- Of Whales and Women, 1956
- Time Out for Happiness, 1970
- Ancestors of the Dozen, 1994

Satire and humour

- Lord Ashley Cooper's Dictionary of Charlestonese, 1950, pseudonym Ashley Cooper, ASIN B0BVCP8DJ9
- How To Be a Father, 1958
- A Dictionary of Bostonese and Charlestonese, 1974, pseudonym Ashley Cooper, ASIN B00GQIXIVS

== Adaptations ==
- Cheaper by the Dozen (1950), film directed by Walter Lang, based on novel Cheaper by the Dozen
- Belles on Their Toes (1952), film directed by Henry Levin, based on novel Belles on Their Toes
- Cheaper by the Dozen (2003), film directed by Shawn Levy, based on novel Cheaper by the Dozen
- Cheaper by the Dozen 2 (2005), film directed by Adam Shankman, based on novels Cheaper by the Dozen and Belles on Their Toes
- Cheaper by the Dozen (2022), film directed by Gail Lerner, based on novel Cheaper by the Dozen
