= Ernestine Gilbreth Carey =

American author

- Born: Ernestine Moller Gilbreth; April 5, 1908; New York City, New York, U.S.
- Died: November 4, 2006 (aged 98); Fresno, California, U.S.
- Education: Smith College
- Known for: Cheaper by the Dozen; Belles on Their Toes
- Spouse: Charles Everett Carey (m. 1930; died 1986)
- Children: 2
- Parents: Frank Bunker Gilbreth (father); Lillian Moller Gilbreth (mother)
- Relatives: Frank Bunker Gilbreth Jr. (brother); Robert Moller Gilbreth (brother)

Ernestine Moller Gilbreth Carey (née Gilbreth; April 5, 1908 – November 4, 2006) was an American writer.

== Early life and education ==
Ernestine Moller Gilbreth was born in New York City on April 5, 1908. She was the daughter of Frank B. and Lillian (Moller) Gilbreth, early scientific management experts and early 20th-century pioneers of time and motion study and what would now be called organizational behavior. The third oldest of twelve children (eleven of whom lived to adulthood), Gilbreth grew up in Montclair, New Jersey, in an unconventional household.

Frank Gilbreth suffered a fatal heart attack on the eve of Ernestine's high school graduation, which delayed Ernestine's college plans by a year, as the family's finances dictated that her mother return to work immediately, carrying on the work she and her husband did as industrial/management consultants.

In 1929, Gilbreth graduated from Smith College as an English major.

== Career ==
Gilbreth Carey found work as a buyer and manager for Macy's in 1930.

She worked there until 1944, when her family moved to Manhasset on Long Island. Carey immersed herself in the community and spent more time with her children, but soon realized she needed something more to do and began writing, drafting a "fact-based" draft of a novel about her childhood.

When her brother Frank, Jr. returned from service in World War II and was having a rough re-entry to civilian life, their mother suggested that Gilbreth Carey share the novel with her brother, who had returned to his pre-war profession of journalism. He tightened the prose and injected more humor.

Cheaper by the Dozen was published in 1948 and was adapted as an eponymous 1950 film. The pair followed up with a successful sequel, Belles on Their Toes (1950), which was adapted as an eponymous 1952 film. Because they had shared their stories-and their lives-in the successful novels, Ernestine and Frank, Jr. decided to share evenly amongst their siblings and their mother all royalties from both books and the movies based on them.

Gilbreth Carey would go on to publish three more novels during the 1950s, all semi-autobiographical: Jumping Jupiter (1952), Rings around Us (1956), an account of the events that happened from the night she met her future husband, to the night the two watched their daughter dance the Charleston as a high school freshman, and Giddy Moment (1958), though none of them would come close to the popularity of Cheaper by the Dozen.

Thereafter Carey's career as a writer stalled and she was never able to find a publisher for her last two novels, As Silver is Tried (1960s) and Razzle Dazzle (1970s). After her mother died in 1972, Carey became the primary family historian, especially interested in securing the legacy of her two parents, particularly that of her mother whose impressive career as an engineer spanned more than four decades after the death of Carey's father. From the 1970s until shortly before her death in 2006, Carey researched and wrote multiple drafts of various versions of biographical treatments of both her parents and her mother. However, she was unable to find an interested publisher.

In addition to her career as an author, Carey was active in the anti-censorship group, Right to Read, Inc., and was a fervent supporter of public libraries, serving as a trustee for the Manhasset Public Library during the 1950s until the family moved to Arizona in 1959.

During the 1950s and early 1960s, Carey enjoyed a moderately successful career as a speaker, especially for women's clubs and local libraries. She based most of her talks on her main interests: her family and the "right to read" anything one wanted. Ernestine Gilbreth Carey was also an active alumna, holding office in her local Smith College clubs both on Long Island and in Phoenix. She was a Smith College trustee from 1967 to 1972.

== Personal life ==
In 1930, she married Charles Everett ("Chick") Carey Sr., a salesman for the Sperry Reed Corporation. The couple had two children, Lillian (Jill) Carey Barley (b. 1938) and Charles Everett Carey Jr. (b. 1942). The children were born in New York City, and Gilbreth Carey returned to work soon after each child was born.

== Later life and death ==
Carey resided in Reedley, California. She died of natural causes in Fresno, California, aged 98, on November 4, 2006.

== Works ==
All are semi-autobiographical novels.

Cheaper by the Dozen] series (with Frank Gilbreth Jr.):

1. Cheaper by the Dozen (1st ed.). Thomas Y. Crowell. 1948. ASIN B001ACNZYK.
2. Belles on Their Toes (1st ed.). Thomas Y. Crowell. 1950. ASIN B0007F54BI.

Stand-alones:

- Jumping Jupiter (1st ed.). Little, Brown and Company. 1956. ASIN B000J2UUVI.
- Rings Around Us (1st ed.). Little Brown & Co. 1956. ASIN B0000CJJI9.
- Giddy Moment (1st ed.). Little, Brown. 1958. ASIN B0006AVF3A.

== Adaptations ==
- Cheaper by the Dozen (1950), film directed by Walter Lang, based on novel Cheaper by the Dozen
- Belles on Their Toes (1952), film directed by Henry Levin, based on novel Belles on Their Toes
- Cheaper by the Dozen (2003), film directed by Shawn Levy, based on novel Cheaper by the Dozen
- Cheaper by the Dozen 2 (2005), film directed by Adam Shankman, based on novels Cheaper by the Dozen and Belles on Their Toes
- Cheaper by the Dozen (2022), film directed by Gail Lerner, based on novel Cheaper by the Dozen
