= Cheaper by the Dozen 2 =

2005 film by Adam Shankman

- Theatrical release poster
- Directed by: Adam Shankman
- Written by: Sam Harper
- Based on: Characters by Craig Titley Cheaper by the Dozen (1948 book); Belles on Their Toes by Ernestine Gilbreth Carey; Frank Bunker Gilbreth Jr.
- Produced by: Shawn Levy; Ben Myron
- Starring: Steve Martin; Eugene Levy; Bonnie Hunt; Tom Welling; Piper Perabo; Hilary Duff
- Cinematography: Peter James
- Edited by: Matthew Cassel; Christopher Greenbury
- Music by: John Debney
- Production companies: 20th Century Fox; 21 Laps Entertainment
- Distributed by: 20th Century Fox
- Release date: December 21, 2005
- Running time: 94 minutes
- Country: United States
- Language: English
- Budget: $60 million
- Box office: $135 million

Cheaper by the Dozen 2 is a 2005 American family comedy film directed by Adam Shankman. It is the sequel to Cheaper by the Dozen (2003) and stars Steve Martin, Bonnie Hunt, Tom Welling, Piper Perabo, and Hilary Duff with Kevin G. Schmidt, Alyson Stoner, Jacob Smith, Forrest Landis, Liliana Mumy, Morgan York, Blake Woodruff, and Brent and Shane Kinsman reprising their roles as members of the 12-child Baker family, alongside Eugene Levy, Carmen Electra, Shawn Roberts, Jaime King, Robbie Amell, Taylor Lautner, and Jonathan Bennett as new characters. It tells the story of the Baker family as they go on a vacation and contend with a rival family, the Murtaughs.

The film was released in the United States by 20th Century Fox on December 21, 2005. It received negative reviews from critics and grossed $135 million worldwide against a $60 million budget.

== Plot ==
Two years after Tom Baker resigned from his head coaching position, his family undergoes many changes, beginning with Lorraine's high school graduation and internship with Allure magazine in New York City. Nora is now married to Bud McNulty and pregnant with their first child, with the intent to move to Houston, Texas because of Bud's new job.

Feeling the family is breaking apart as the children grow up, Tom persuades them to take one last family vacation at Lake Winnetka in Wisconsin. The family finds out that their old cabin is owned by a man named Mike Romanow. Tom's old rival, Jimmy Murtaugh, his new wife Sarina, and his eight kids Calvin, Anne, Daniel, Becky, Elliot, Lisa, Robin, and Kenny stay at the lake for the summer; Jimmy is also friends and neighbors with Mike.

Jimmy flaunts his wealth and success to Tom, as well as the accomplishments of his children, often suggesting that Tom is less successful because of his parenting style. They get into many incidents: Mark accidentally sets off a backpack of fireworks, causing widespread panic, especially when it is thrown into a boat, igniting its engine and causing it to explode; he and Kenny crash into a tennis court with a golf cart; and Sarah gets caught shoplifting.

Jimmy again brings up the topic that Tom needs to be stricter with his kids. This angers Tom, and he and Jimmy decide to settle the matter at the Annual Labor Day Family Cup. Tom trains the kids for days, not realizing they are miserable. Sarah and Elliot go to the cinema to see Ice Age, but they're spied on by their fathers, resulting in them getting into an altercation and humiliating their children. Upon returning to the Bakers' cabin, Sarah refuses to compete for Tom in the Cup. Kate laments that his and Jimmy's conflicting parenting styles have torn the families apart.

The next morning, Tom goes to the Cup to compete with Kyle and Nigel, the only two still willing to go. However, after discovering an old "Team Baker" flag, Kate and the other kids show up, willing to compete again. After the events, the Bakers and the Murtaughs are tied for first; a tiebreaking canoe race is announced, in which every family member must compete.

During the race, Nora goes into labor. The Murtaughs want to help, but Jimmy, sensing the opportunity to defeat Tom once and for all, refuses. The Murtaugh children jump out of the canoe to help the Bakers. While arguing with Sarina, Jimmy reveals that he was jealous of Tom being the popular one when they were younger. Eventually, Sarina convinces him to help, and the families work together to get Nora to the hospital.

Bud announces that he and Nora have bought the cabin back at the lake. Nora, Bud, and Baby Tom leave for Houston a few days later, and the family enjoys the rest of their vacation.

== Cast ==
=== Bakers ===
- Steve Martin as Tom Baker, the patriarch of the Baker family and retired football coach.
- Bonnie Hunt as Kate Gilbreth-Baker, the matriarch of the Baker family and Tom's wife who provides the opening narration.
- Piper Perabo as Nora Baker-McNulty, Tom and Kate's first daughter, Bud's wife, and Baby Tom's mother.
- Jonathan Bennett as Bud McNulty, Nora's husband, Tom and Kate's son-in-law, and Baby Tom's father
- Tom Welling as Charlie Baker, Tom and Kate's first son who becomes a mechanic in order to pay off his college tuition.
- Hilary Duff as Lorraine Baker, Tom and Kate's second daughter who is planning to move to New York so that she can intern at Allure magazine.
- Kevin G. Schmidt as Henry Baker, Tom and Kate's second son.
- Alyson Stoner as Sarah Baker, Tom and Kate's third daughter.
- Jacob Smith as Jake Baker, Tom and Kate's third son.
- Forrest Landis as Mark Baker, Tom and Kate's fourth son.
- Liliana Mumy as Jessica Baker, Tom and Kate's fourth daughter and Kim's fraternal twin sister.
- Morgan York as Kim Baker, Tom and Kate's fifth daughter and Jessica's fraternal twin sister.
- Blake Woodruff as Mike Baker, Tom and Kate's fifth son.
- Brent Kinsman as Nigel Baker, Tom and Kate's sixth son and Kyle's identical twin brother.
- Shane Kinsman as Kyle Baker, Tom and Kate's seventh son and Nigel's identical twin brother.

=== Murtaughs ===
- Eugene Levy as Jimmy Murtaugh, the patriarch of the Murtaugh family who is an old rival of Tom.
- Carmen Electra as Sarina Murtaugh, the matriarch of the Murtaugh family and Jimmy's trophy wife.
- Shawn Roberts as Calvin Murtaugh, Jimmy's first son who is a student at Yale University.
- Jaime King as Anne Murtaugh, Jimmy's first daughter who becomes Charlie's love interest. She is hiding a lower-back tattoo of a butterfly from her father as an act of rebellion.
- Robbie Amell as Daniel Murtaugh, Jimmy's second son.
- Melanie Tonello as Becky Murtaugh, Jimmy's second daughter.
- Taylor Lautner as Elliot "Eliot" Murtaugh, Jimmy's third son who becomes Sarah's love interest.
- Courtney Fitzpatrick as Lisa Murtaugh, Jimmy's third daughter and Robin's identical twin sister.
- Madison Fitzpatrick as Robin Murtaugh, Jimmy's fourth daughter and Lisa's identical twin sister.
- Alexander Conti as Kenneth "Kenny" Murtaugh, Jimmy's fourth son.

=== Others ===
- Peter Keleghan as Mike Romanow, Jimmy's neighbor and friend who is the owner of the old cabin at Lake Winnetka that the Baker family rents and is also the emcee of the Annual Labor Day Family Cup.
- William Copeland as the Commodore

The director of the first film and producer of the sequel, Shawn Levy, has a cameo as a hospital intern. Ben Falcone appears as a cinema customer who gets upset with Tom and Jimmy's quarrel.

== Soundtrack ==
1. "I Wish" – Stevie Wonder
2. "Graduation Day Song" – Joseph L. Altruda
3. "Mexicali Mondays" – Christopher Lightbody and Robert Steinmiller
4. "What If" – Gina Rene
5. "Martini Lounge" – David Sparkman
6. "Drinks on the House" – Daniel May
7. "Big Sky Lullaby" – Daniel May
8. "Someday" – Sugar Ray
9. "Express Yourself" – Jason Mraz
10. "Michael Finnegan" – Traditional
11. "Will the Circle Be Unbroken?" – Traditional
12. "Why Can't We Be Friends" – War
13. "Die Walküre" – Richard Wagner
14. "Wooly Bully" – Sam the Sham and the Pharaohs
15. "Mallin" – Tree Adams
16. "Under Pressure" – Queen and David Bowie
17. "Music from Ice Age" – David Newman
18. "Holiday" – Madonna
19. "Sunday Morning" (acoustic version) – Maroon 5
20. "Bridal Chorus" – Richard Wagner

== Reception ==
=== Critical response ===
On the review aggregator website Rotten Tomatoes, 8% of 93 critics' reviews are positive. The website's consensus reads: "A sequel to a remake, Cheaper 2 wastes its solid cast in scenes of over-the-top, predictable humor." Metacritic, which uses a weighted average, assigned the film a score of 34 out of 100, based on 24 critics, indicating "generally unfavorable" reviews. Audiences polled by CinemaScore gave the film an average grade of "A−" on an A+ to F scale, the same grade as the first film.

Chicago Sun-Times critic Roger Ebert, gave the film one of its rare positive reviews, awarding it 3 out of 4 stars and stating "As I watched this sequel, a certain good feeling began to make itself known. Yes, the movie is unnecessary. However, it is unnecessary at a higher level of warmth and humor than the recent remake Yours, Mine, and Ours." Ebert also highly praised Alyson Stoner's performance, favorably comparing the then-twelve-year-old actress to Reese Witherspoon.

Calling the overall film "bland", Variety's Justin Chang agreed with Ebert on Stoner, calling her "an endearingly vulnerable standout" and deeming her subplot to be "the most engaging" in it. Chang was also kind to Steve Martin, Bonnie Hunt, and Eugene Levy, deeming the veteran actors did the best with what was given to them. Marrit Ingman of the Austin Chronicle conceded that it had a good message, and agreed that Hunt was "marvelous and down-to-earth" but ultimately felt that "the rest of the movie is as funny as mildew", found that "the product placement is particularly egregious" and thought that Hilary Duff looked "as tanned and raw as buffalo jerky". Andrea Gronvall was also horrified by Duff's appearance while writing for the Chicago Reader, calling her "haggard" and "flat-out scary", and overall felt that there was "a discernible lack of enthusiasm from almost everyone involved", however singling out Carmen Electra for being "the most winning performer of the bunch".

The film received two Razzie Award nominations, including Worst Actress (Hilary Duff) and Worst Supporting Actor (Eugene Levy).

=== Box office ===
The film grossed $9,309,387 on its opening weekend, finishing in 4th place at the box office behind King Kong, The Chronicles of Narnia: The Lion, the Witch and the Wardrobe, and Fun with Dick and Jane. By the end of its run, Cheaper by the Dozen 2 grossed $82,571,173 domestically and $46,610,657 internationally, totaling $129,181,830 worldwide. It is one of only twelve feature films to be released in over 3,000 theaters and still improves on its box office performance in its second weekend, increasing 55.6% from $9,309,387 to $14,486,519.

== Home media ==
Cheaper by the Dozen 2 was released on DVD on May 23, 2006, by 20th Century Fox Home Entertainment. The film was also released on Blu-ray on January 5, 2010. The DVD is two-sided and side B features previews of Flicka and Aquamarine. Other DVD extras include an audio commentary with director Adam Shankman, behind-the-scenes featurettes, and theatrical trailers.
