= Cheaper by the Dozen (1950 film) =

1950 film by Walter Lang

- Theatrical release poster
- Directed by: Walter Lang
- Screenplay by: Lamar Trotti
- Based on: Cheaper by the Dozen; 1948 novel by Ernestine Gilbreth Carey; Frank Bunker Gilbreth Jr.
- Produced by: Lamar Trotti
- Starring: Clifton Webb; Jeanne Crain; Myrna Loy; Betty Lynn; Edgar Buchanan; Barbara Bates; Mildred Natwick; Sara Allgood
- Narrated by: Jeanne Crain
- Cinematography: Leon Shamroy
- Edited by: James Watson Webb Jr.
- Music by: Cyril J. Mockridge
- Color process: Technicolor
- Production company: 20th Century Fox
- Distributed by: 20th Century Fox
- Release dates: March 31, 1950 (New York); April 7, 1950 (Los Angeles)
- Running time: 85 minutes
- Country: United States
- Language: English
- Budget: $1.7 million
- Box office: $4.3-4.425 million (U.S. and Canada rentals)

Cheaper by the Dozen is a 1950 American comedy film based upon the autobiographical book Cheaper by the Dozen (1948) by Frank Bunker Gilbreth Jr. and Ernestine Gilbreth Carey. The film and book describe life in a family with twelve children in Montclair, New Jersey.

The story of the Gilbreth family is continued in the book Belles on Their Toes, which was adapted as a film in 1952, with some of the original cast.

== Plot ==
Time-and-motion study and efficiency expert Frank Bunker Gilbreth Sr. and his wife, psychologist Lillian Moller Gilbreth, raise 12 children in 1920s Providence, Rhode Island and Montclair, New Jersey. Frank employs unorthodox teaching methods with his children, who clash with their parents.

Frank takes every opportunity to study motion and increase efficiency, including filming his children's tonsillectomies to investigate opportunities to streamline the operation. He escorts his daughter to her prom as a chaperone but chats and dances with her female friends.

Frank is sent on a lecture tour to Europe, expecting to visit Prague and London. While phoning Lillian from the station, he suffers a heart attack. After Frank's sudden death, the family members agree that Lillian will continue her husband's work, beginning with delivering his lectures in Europe. This enables the family to remain in their house rather than move to their grandmother's house in California. With a widowed working mother and one income, the children will have to assume much greater responsibilities.

== Cast ==
- Clifton Webb as Frank Bunker Gilbreth (father)
- Myrna Loy as Mrs. Lillian Moller Gilbreth (mother)
- Jeanne Crain as Ann Gilbreth
- Barbara Bates as Ernestine Gilbreth
- Betty Barker as Mary Gilbreth
- Patti Brady as Martha Gilbreth
- Norman Ollestad as Frank Gilbreth Jr.
- Carol Nugent as Lillie Gilbreth
- Jimmy Hunt as William Gilbreth
- Anthony Sydes as Fred Gilbreth
- Teddy Driver as Dan Gilbreth
- Roddy McCaskill as Jack Gilbreth
- Walter Baldwin as Jim Bracken
- Sara Allgood as Mrs. Monahan
- Evelyn Varden as School Principal
- Edgar Buchanan as Dr. Burton
- Mildred Natwick as Mrs. Mebane
- Betty Lynn as Deborah
- Craig Hill as Tom Black
- Benny Bartlett as Joe Scales

== Production ==
Twentieth Century-Fox head Darryl F. Zanuck paid a six-figure amount for the film rights for the story in early 1949.

Eighteen child actors were involved in the production, and their mandatory daily school sessions on the set added $200,000 to the film's budget.

The birth order in which Cheaper by the Dozen portrays some of the children is not the same order in which the real Gilbreth children were born. For example, Robert (who was born in 1920) is shown as being born in 1922 as the last child after Jane (who was born in 1922). This is reversed in the film's sequel. In real life, Mary, who was the second child, died in 1912 at the age of five. However, in the film, she is placed as the third child after Ernestine, and has few or no lines.

Both Frank and Lillian Gilbreth were important figures in real life. The voiceover at the end of the film explains that Lillian became the world's leading efficiency expert and Woman of the Year in 1948, a title bestowed by the Twentieth Century Club of Buffalo.

== Reception ==
In a contemporary review for The New York Times, critic Bosley Crowther called Cheaper by the Dozen "a picture of illusions—happy, sentimental, even absurd" and wrote: "Plotless and episodic, it is strictly a farcical account of one little thing after another happening in a houseful of kids. And although some episodes are banal, as against others that are witty and bright ... it all adds up to entertainment of a broad, brash and innocent sort. ...[T]he whole thing is artfully centered around the triumphant Mr. Webb, who plays with the sweeping assurance of not only an authoritarian but a special star."

Critic Edwin Schallert of the Los Angeles Times wrote: "The death of this super father climaxes the story as told. It means a pensive finale. Yet one can well say that this is too often the way things sadly happen. You are not made too conscious of the spell of grief, because it is so obliquely dealt with in the picture. Yet it is an important thing in separating 'Cheaper by the Dozen' from the general run of family life comedies, and giving it a thought-provoking impact. As a result this feature is much more worth while than many that have conformed with a somewhat similar basically joyous pattern. ... The picture, though much brighter, has something of the nostalgia of an 'I Remember Mama.' It is alive with big laughs 90% of the way and the quiet subdued finish seems very legitimate."
