= Frank Bunker Gilbreth =

American industrial engineer (1868–1924)

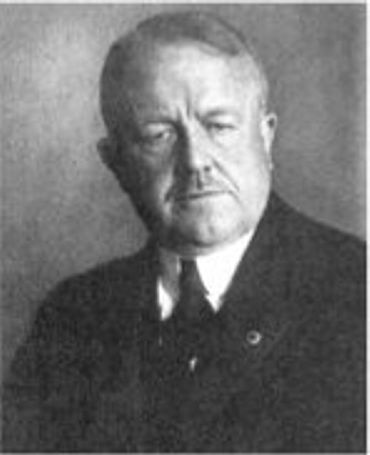
- Frank Bunker Gilbreth
- Born: July 7, 1868; Fairfield, Maine, U.S.
- Died: June 14, 1924 (aged 55); Montclair, New Jersey, U.S.
- Occupations: Builder; Industrial engineer; Management consultant
- Known for: Time-motion study
- Spouse: Lillian Moller (m. 1904)
- Children: 13, including Ernestine, Frank Jr., and Robert

Frank Bunker Gilbreth (July 7, 1868 – June 14, 1924) was an American engineer, consultant, and author known as an early advocate of scientific management and a pioneer of time and motion study, and is perhaps best known as the father and central figure of Cheaper by the Dozen.

Both he and his wife Lillian Moller Gilbreth were industrial engineers and efficiency experts who contributed to the study of industrial engineering in fields such as motion study and human factors.

== Biography ==
=== Early life and education ===
Gilbreth was born in Fairfield, Maine, on July 7, 1868. He was the third child and only son of John Hiram Gilbreth and Martha Bunker Gilbreth. His mother had been a schoolteacher. His father owned a hardware store and was a stockbreeder. When Gilbreth was three and a half years old his father died suddenly from pneumonia.

After his father's death his mother moved the family to Andover, Massachusetts, to find better schools for her children. The substantial estate left by her husband was managed by her husband's family. By the fall of 1878 the money had been lost or stolen and Martha Gilbreth had to find a way to make a living. She moved the family to Boston where good public schools existed. She opened a boarding house since a schoolteacher's salary would not support the family.

Gilbreth was not a good student. He attended Rice Grammar School, but his mother was concerned enough to teach him at home for a year. He attended Boston's English High School, and his grades improved when he became interested in his science and math classes. He took the entrance examinations for the Massachusetts Institute of Technology, but wanted his mother to be able to give up the boarding house. He decided to go to work rather than to college.

=== Whidden Construction Company ===
Renton Whidden, Gilbreth's old Sunday School teacher, hired him for his building company. He was to start as a laborer, learn the various building trades, and work his way up in the firm. In July 1885 at age 17 he started as a bricklayer's helper. As he learned bricklaying he noticed the many variations in the bricklayers' methods and efficiency. This began his interest in finding "the one best way" of executing any task. He quickly learned every part of building work and contracting, and advanced rapidly. He took night school classes to learn mechanical drawing. After five years he was a superintendent, which allowed his mother to give up her boarding house.

Using his observations of workmen laying brick, Gilbreth developed a multilevel scaffold that kept the bricks within easy reach of the bricklayer. He began patenting his innovations with this "Vertical Scaffold", then developed and patented the "Gilbreth Waterproof Cellar". He made innovations in concrete construction, as well. After ten years, at age 27, he was the chief superintendent. When after ten years the Whiddens were unwilling to make him a partner, he resigned to start his own company.

=== Career as general contractor ===
Gilbreth founded his own commercial contracting firm on April 1, 1895. For the next fifteen years, "Frank B. Gilbreth, General Contractor" and two subsidiary companies would build some 100 large-scale projects across the United States (along with two in Canada), including full scale factories, paper mills, canals, dams and powerhouses. The largest such project was a complete paper mill constructed in 1907–08 in Canton, North Carolina. It was a $2 million facility consisting of more than thirty full-scale industrial buildings.

One Gilbreth construction project was the Simmons Hardware Company's Sioux City Warehouse. The architects had specified that hundreds of 20-foot (6.1 m) hardened concrete piles (based on Gibreth's own patents for design and installation) were to be driven in to allow the soft ground to take the weight of two million bricks required to construct the building. The "Time and Motion" approach could be applied to the bricklaying and the transportation. The building was also required to support efficient input and output of deliveries via its own railroad switching facilities.

Gilbreth held thirteen patents as an inventor, beginning in his years with the Whiddens, and had patent and product management offices in London and Berlin. Other than two projects in Ontario, Canada, and a third that was abandoned after initial construction, he did not build any projects outside the United States.

=== Career as efficiency expert ===
Gilbreth changed careers to efficiency and management engineering with the close of his construction companies in about 1912. He eventually became an occasional lecturer at Purdue University, which houses his papers.

Gilbreth discovered his vocation as efficiency expert while still a young construction worker, when he sought ways to make bricklaying faster and easier. During the later part of his contracting career, this grew into a collaboration with his wife, Lillian Moller Gilbreth. Together they studied the work habits of manufacturing and clerical employees in all sorts of industries to find ways to increase output and make their jobs easier. He and Lillian founded a management consulting firm, Frank B. Gilbreth, Inc. (renamed Gilbreth, Inc. after his death), focusing on such endeavors.

Gilbreth was also an adamant champion of the "cost-plus-a-fixed sum" contract in his building contracting business. He described this method in an article in Industrial Magazine in 1907, comparing it to fixed price and guaranteed maximum price methods. Many of his prolific advertisements throughout the era boast of and recommend this as "their special method of construction."

=== Family ===
Gilbreth married Lillian Evelyn Moller on October 19, 1904, in Oakland, California; they had 13 children. Their names were:

- Anne Moller Gilbreth Barney (1905–1987)
- Mary Elizabeth Gilbreth (1906–1912)
- Ernestine Moller Gilbreth Carey (1908–2006)
- Martha Bunker Gilbreth Tallman (1909–1968)
- Frank Bunker Gilbreth Jr. (1911–2001)
- William Moller Gilbreth (1912–1990)
- Lillian Gilbreth Johnson (1914–2001)
- Frederick Moller Gilbreth (1916–2015)
- Daniel Bunker Gilbreth (1917–2006)
- John Moller Gilbreth (1919–2002)
- Robert Moller Gilbreth (1920–2007)
- Jane Moller Gilbreth Heppes (1922–2006)
- There was a stillborn daughter (1915) who was not named.

=== Death ===
Gilbreth died of a heart attack on June 14, 1924, at age 55. He was at the Lackawanna Terminal in Montclair, New Jersey, talking with his wife by telephone. In accordance with his wishes, his brain was donated to Harvard University, and his ashes were scattered in the Atlantic Ocean. Lillian outlived him by 48 years.

== Work ==
=== Motion studies ===
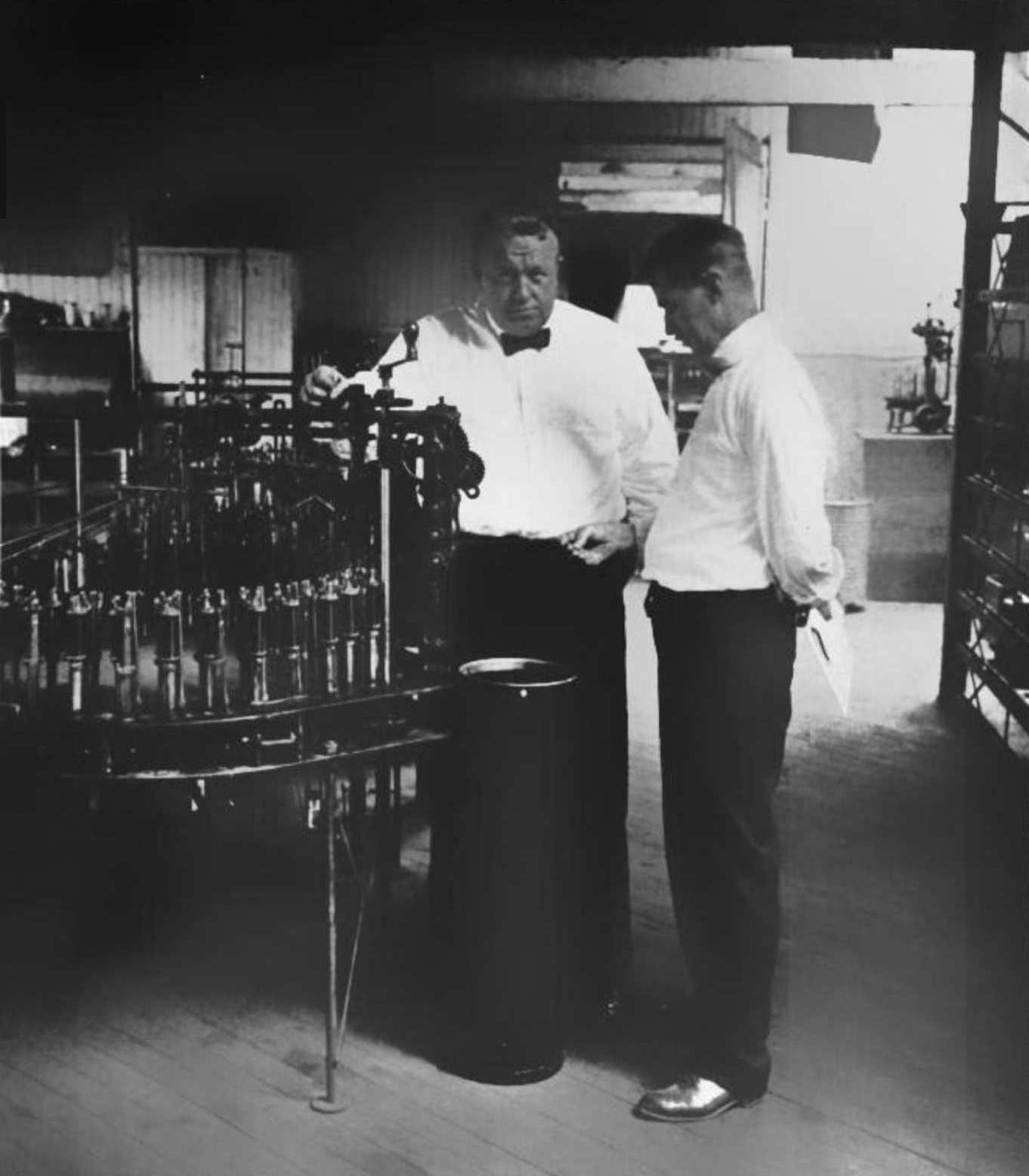
Gilbreth in about 1916

Original Films Of Frank B. Gilbreth (Part I)

Gilbreth served as a major in the U.S. Army during World War I. His assignment was to find quicker and more efficient means of assembling and disassembling small arms. However, he was stricken with rheumatic fever and then pneumonia just weeks into his service, and spent four months in recovery before being discharged. The heart damage from this episode would contribute to his premature death six years later. According to Claude George (1968), Gilbreth reduced all motions of the hand into some combination of 17 basic motions. These included grasp, transport loaded, and hold. Gilbreth named the motions therbligs — "Gilbreth" spelled (approximately) backwards. He used a motion picture camera that was calibrated in fractions of minutes to time the smallest of motions in workers.

Their emphasis on the "one best way" and therbligs predates the development of continuous quality improvement (CQI), and the late 20th century understanding that repeated motions can lead to workers experiencing repetitive motion injuries.

Gilbreth was the first to propose the position of "caddy" (Gilbreth's term) to a surgeon, who handed surgical instruments to the surgeon as needed. Gilbreth also devised the standard techniques used by armies around the world to teach recruits how to rapidly disassemble and reassemble their weapons even when blindfolded or in total darkness.

=== Scientific management ===
The work of the Gilbreths is often associated with that of Frederick Winslow Taylor, yet there was a substantial philosophical difference between the Gilbreths and Taylor. The symbol of Taylorism was the stopwatch; Taylor was concerned primarily with reducing process times. The Gilbreths, in contrast, sought to make processes more efficient by reducing the motions involved. They saw their approach as more concerned with workers' welfare than Taylorism, which workers themselves often perceived as concerned mainly with profit. This difference led to a personal rift between Taylor and the Gilbreths which, after Taylor's death, turned into a feud between the Gilbreths and Taylor's followers. After Frank's death, Lillian Gilbreth took steps to heal the rift; however, some friction remains over questions of history and intellectual property.

=== Fatigue study ===
In conducting their Motion Study method to work, they found that the key to improving work efficiency was in reducing unnecessary motions. Not only were some motions unnecessary, but they caused employee fatigue. Their efforts to reduce fatigue included reduced motions, tool redesign, parts placement, and bench and seating height, for which they began to develop workplace standards. The Gilbreths' work broke ground for contemporary understanding of Ergonomics.

== Legacy ==
Frank and Lillian Gilbreth often used their large family (and Frank himself) as guinea pigs in experiments. Their family exploits are lovingly detailed in the 1948 book Cheaper by the Dozen, written by son Frank Jr. and daughter Ernestine (Ernestine Gilbreth Carey). The book inspired a film and the title inspired a second and third unrelated film of the same name. The first, in 1950, starred Clifton Webb and Myrna Loy. The second, in 2003, starred comedians Steve Martin and Bonnie Hunt, and bears no resemblance to the book, except that it features a family with twelve children, and the wife's maiden name is Gilbreth. The third, in 2022, also bears no relation to the book and starred Gabrielle Union and Zach Braff. A 1952 sequel titled Belles on Their Toes chronicled the adventures of the Gilbreth family after Frank's 1924 death. A later biography of his parents, Time Out For Happiness, was written by Frank Bunker Gilbreth, Jr. alone in 1962.

The award for lifetime achievement by the Institute of Industrial and Systems Engineers (IISE) is named in Frank and Lillian Gilbreth's honor.

His maxim of "I will always choose a lazy person to do a difficult job, because a lazy person will find an easy way to do it" is still commonly used today, although it is often misattributed to Bill Gates, who merely repeated the quote but did not originate it.

== Selected publications ==
Frank and Lillian Gilbreth wrote in collaboration, but Lillian's name was not included on the title page until after she earned her PhD.

- — (1909). Bricklaying System. The M.C. Clark Publishing Co. ISBN 978-1402161131. LCCN 74014805. OCLC 190641233. OL 32552248M – via Internet Archive.
- — (1911). Motion Study: A Method for Increasing the Efficiency of the Workman. Introduction by Robert Thurston Kent. D. Van Nostrand Company – via Internet Archive.
- — (1912). Primer of Scientific Management. D. Van Nostrand Company – via Internet Archive.
- —; Gilbreth, Lillian Moller (1916). Fatigue Study, the Elimination of Humanity's Greatest Unnecessary Waste: A First Step in Motion Study. Sturgis & Walton Company – via Internet Archive.
- —; Gilbreth, L. M. (1917). Applied Motion Study: A Collection of Papers on the Efficient Method to Industrial Preparedness. Sturgis & Walton Company – via Internet Archive.
