= Robert Moller Gilbreth =

American educator, businessman, and politician (1920–2007)

Member of the New Hampshire House of Representatives
- In office 1984–1994

Personal details
- Born: July 4, 1920 Nantucket, Massachusetts, U.S.
- Died: July 27, 2007 (aged 87) Franklin, New Hampshire, U.S.
- Parent(s): Frank Bunker Gilbreth; Lillian Moller Gilbreth

Robert Moller Gilbreth (July 4, 1920 – July 27, 2007) was an American educator, businessman, and politician.

Gilbreth was born in Nantucket, Massachusetts. His parents were Frank Bunker Gilbreth Sr. and Lillian Moller Gilbreth. He went to the Montclair, New Jersey public schools. He received his bachelor's degree from the University of North Carolina in 1943 and his master's degree in education from Plymouth State University. Gilbreth also went to the University of Massachusetts for graduate studies. He taught school in Nantucket, Massachusetts and owned the Anchor Inn with his wife on Nantucket Island. Gilbreth then taught school and served as a principal for the Franklin, New Hampshire Junior and Senior High Schools.

Gilbreth served as the Franklin Telegram newspaper part-time reporter. In 1984, Gilbreth served in the New Hampshire Constitutional Convention of 1984. He also served on the Franklin School Board from 1980 to 1987. From 1985 to 1994, Gilbreth served in the New Hampshire House of Representatives. In 1985, Gilbreth opposed a bill in the legislature that human life begins at conception. Gilbreth did not agree with women who wanted abortions. However, he felt counseling was needed. In 2007, Gilbreth died from cancer at the Franklin Regional Hospital in Franklin, New Hampshire.
