= Cheaper by the Dozen =

1948 novel by Gilbreth and Gilbreth Carey

- First edition cover (Thomas Y. Crowell Co.)
- Author: Frank B. Gilbreth Jr. and Ernestine Gilbreth Carey
- Language: English
- Genre: Autobiography
- Publisher: Thomas Y. Crowell Co.
- Publication date: 1948
- Media type: Print
- Pages: 237
- ISBN: 0-06-076313-2
- Followed by: Belles on Their Toes (1950 book; 1952 film)

Cheaper by the Dozen is a semi-autobiographical novel written by Frank Bunker Gilbreth Jr. and Ernestine Gilbreth Carey, published in 1948. The novel recounts the authors' childhood lives growing up in a household of 12 children. The bestselling book was later adapted into a feature film by Twentieth Century Fox in 1950 and followed up by the sequel, Belles on Their Toes (1950), which was adapted as a 1952 film.

== Plot ==
The book tells the story of time and motion study and efficiency experts Frank Bunker Gilbreth and Lillian Moller Gilbreth, and their children as they reside in Montclair, New Jersey, for many years. Lillian Gilbreth was described in the 1940s as "a genius in the art of living".

The best-selling biographical novel was composed by two of the children, who wrote about their childhoods. Gilbreth's home doubled as a sort of real-world laboratory that tested her and her husband Frank's ideas about education and efficiency. The book is more of a series of stories, many of which are humorous, with little overarching narrative.

The title comes from one of Frank Sr.'s favorite jokes: it often happened that when he and his family were out driving and stopped at a red light, a pedestrian would ask, "Hey, Mister! How come you got so many kids?" Gilbreth would pretend to ponder the question carefully, and then, just as the light turned green, would say, "Well, they come cheaper by the dozen, you know", and drive off.

At several points in the book, a total number of children is spoken of as being 12. In real life, although the Gilbreths had 12 children who survived infanthood, only up to 11 were living at the time of the stories. In fact, when Mary died of diphtheria at age five, seven of her siblings were not yet born, so there never were 12 children alive at the same time. The only chapter that mentions Mary by name is the one that tells the stories of the children's births; otherwise, she is not mentioned and her absence is not explained. It was not until the sequel, Belles on Their Toes, was published in 1950 that Mary's death is mentioned in a footnote. In the rest of the book, only the 11 children who lived to adulthood are mentioned by name. From oldest to youngest, they are Anne, Ernestine (Ern), Martha (Mart), Frank Jr., Bill, Lillian (Lill), Fred, Dan, John (Jack), Bob, and Jane.

The stories in the book are organized topically. They skip around in time, and the details of the timing are not always made clear. For example, Bill is mentioned as having been six years old at the time of the story in which he honks the car horn while his father is under the hood trying to fix the engine. This would have been around 1919, before the three youngest children were born, though this detail is not mentioned.

The book ends with the sudden death of Frank Sr, which occurred in 1924. At that time, the oldest child (Anne) was 20 years old and the youngest (Jane) was nearly two years old.

== Adaptations ==
Cheaper by the Dozen was made into a 1950 motion picture, starring Clifton Webb and Myrna Loy as Frank and Lillian Gilbreth. The film was produced by 20th Century Fox.

Cheaper by the Dozen was adapted as a stage play in 1950 by Christopher Sergel. It played at Grey Lite Theatre in 1992, directed by Lori David.

Cheaper by the Dozen has been adapted as a musical, dramatized by Christopher Sergel with a score by David Rogers and Mark Bucci.

Cheaper by the Dozen (2003) and Cheaper by the Dozen 2 (2005), starring comedians Steve Martin and Bonnie Hunt, have little relationship with the book other than the title and the focus on a family with 12 children. On the cover of Kate's book (Kate is the female lead character in the movies), the title is shown to be Cheaper by the Dozen, and the author's maiden name appears as Gilbreth (the name of the real family in the book upon which the 1950 film was based). During a game of Apple Schmear, Nora tells Hank that her "Great Grandma Gilbreth" invented the game. Furthermore, Lorraine and Tom argue about how much time she should be allotted in front of the mirror in the mornings. He allots her a few extra minutes, connecting back to the time efficiency specialist that the father, Frank Gilbreth, was in the 1950 film.

On August 6, 2019, following the acquisition of 21st Century Fox by Disney, Disney CEO Bob Iger announced that a reboot of Cheaper by the Dozen was in development and would premiere on the company's streaming service, Disney+. Gail Lerner was selected to direct the film with a script co-written by Kenya Barris and Jenifer Rice-Genzuk Henry. Gabrielle Union and Zach Braff landed starring roles in the film, which was released on March 18, 2022.

== Contemporary appraisals ==
Re-reading the book in 2003, Pulitzer Prize–winning critic Jonathan Yardley wrote in The Washington Post: "[I]t is a joy to report that Cheaper by the Dozen still reads remarkably well. ... The prose ... is unadorned and matter of fact, and its organizational structure is a bit difficult to detect, but what matters most is that it is a touching family portrait that also happens to be very, very funny."

The book won the French International Humor Award and has been translated into a dozen languages.
