= Sweet Dreams (novel series) =

Romance novel series

Sweet Dreams is a series of over 230 numbered, stand-alone teen romance novels that were published from 1981 to 1996. Written by mostly American writers, notable authors include Barbara Conklin, Janet Quin-Harkin, Laurie Lykken, Marilyn Kaye (writing under the pseudonym Shannon Blair), and Yvonne Greene.

Each teen novel dealt with common high school drama and romance themes, including first dates, first love, and conflicts. It was through these books that the major teen book series Sweet Valley High was launched.

Cover designs used photographs of models similar to each novel's heroine's description.The cover of The Last Word featured Courteney Cox.

== Works ==
=== Sweet Dreams ===
1. P.S. I Love You – Barbara Conklin
2. The Popularity Plan – Rosemary Vernon
3. Laurie's Song – Suzanne Rand
4. Princess Amy – Melinda Pollowitz
5. Little Sister – Yvonne Green
6. California Girl – Janet Quin-Harkin
7. Green Eyes – Suzanne Rand
8. The Thoroughbred – Joanne Campbell
9. Cover Girl – Yvonne Green
10. Love Match – Janet Quin-Harkin
11. The Problem With Love – Rosemary Vernon
12. Night of the Prom – Debra Spector
13. The Summer Jenny Fell in Love – Barbara Conklin
14. Dance of Love – Jocelyn Saal
15. Thinking of You – Jeanette Nobile
16. How Do You Say Goodbye? – Margaret Burman
17. Ask Annie – Suzanne Rand
18. Ten-Boy Summer – Janet Quin-Harkin
19. Love Song – Anne Park
20. The Popularity Summer – Rosemary Vernon
21. All's Fair in Love – Jeanne Andrews
22. Secret Identity – Joanna Campbell
23. Falling in Love Again – Barbara Conklin
24. The Trouble With Charlie – Jaye Ellen
25. Her Secret Self – Rhondi Willot
26. It Must Be Magic – Marian Woodruff
27. Too Young for Love – Gailanne Maravel
28. Trusting Hearts – Jocelyn Saal
29. Never Love a Cowboy – Jesse DuKore
30. Little White Lies – Lois I. Fisher
31. Too Close for Comfort – Debra Spector
32. Daydreamer – Janet Quin-Harkin
33. Dear Amanda – Rosemary Vernon
34. Country Girl – Melinda Pollowitz
35. Forbidden Love – Marian Woodruff
36. Summer Dreams – Barbara P. Conklin
37. Portrait of Love – Jeanette Nobile
38. Running Mates – Jocelyn Saal
39. First Love – Debra Spector
40. Secrets – Anna Aaron
41. The Truth About Me & Bobby V. – Janetta Johns
42. Perfect Match – Marian Woodruff
43. Tender Loving Care – Anne Park
44. Long Distance – Jesse Dukore
45. Dream Prom – Margaret Burman
46. On Thin Ice – Jocelyn Saal
47. Te Amo Means I Love You – Deborah Kent
48. Dial L for Love – Marian Woodruff
49. Too Much to Lose – Suzanne Rand
50. Lights, Camera, Love – Gailanne Maravel
51. Magic Moments – Debra Spector
52. Love Notes – Joanna Campbell
53. Ghost of a Chance – Janet Quin-Harkin
54. I Can't Forget You – Lois I. Fisher
55. Spotlight On Love – Nancy Pines
56. Campfire Nights – Dale Cowan
57. On Her Own – Suzanne Rand
58. Rhythm of Love – Stefanie Foster
59. Please Say Yes – Alice O. Crawford
60. Summer Breezes – Susan Blake
61. Exchange of Hearts – Janet Quin-Harkin
62. Just Like the Movies – Suzanne Rand
63. Kiss Me, Creep – Marian Woodruff
64. Love in the Fast Lane – Rosemary Vernon
65. The Two of Us – Janet Quin-Harkin
66. Love Times Two – Stephanie Foster
67. I Believe in You – Barbara P. Conklin
68. Lovebirds – Janet Quin-Harkin
69. Call Me Beautiful – Shannon Blair
70. Special Someone – Terri Fields
71. Too Many Boys – Celia Dickenson
72. Goodbye Forever – Barbara P. Conklin
73. Language of Love – Rosemary Vernon
74. Don't Forget Me – Diana Gregory
75. First Summer Love – Stephanie Foster
76. Three Cheers for Love – Suzanne Rand
77. Ten-Speed Summer – Deborah Kent
78. Never Say No – Jean F. Capron
79. Star Struck! – Shannon Blair
80. A Shot at Love – Jill Jarnow
81. Secret Admirer – Debra Spector
82. Hey, Good Looking! – Jane Polcovar
83. Love by the Book – Anne Park
84. The Last Word – Susan Blake
85. The Boy She Left Behind – Suzanne Rand
86. Questions of Love – Rosemary Vernon
87. Programmed for Love – Marion Crane
88. Wrong Kind of Boy – Shannon Blair
89. 101 Ways to Meet Mr. Right – Janet Quin-Harkin
90. Two's a Crowd – Diana Gregory
91. The Love Hunt – Yvonne Greene
92. Kiss and Tell – Shannon Blair
93. The Great Boy Chase – Janet Quin-Harkin
94. Second Chances – Nancy Levinson
95. No Strings Attached – Eileen Hehl
96. First, Last, and Always – Barbara P. Conklin
97. Dancing in the Dark – Carolyn Ross
98. Love Is in the Air – Diana Gregory
99. One Boy Too Many – Janet Quin-Harkin
100. Follow That Boy – Marian Caudell
101. Wrong for Each Other – Deborah Spector
102. Hearts Don't Lie – Terri Fields
103. Cross My Heart – Diana Gregory
104. Playing for Keeps – Janice Stevens
105. The Perfect Boy – Elizabeth Reynolds
106. Mission: Love – Kathryn Makris
107. If You Love Me – Barbara Steiner
108. One of the Boys – Jill Jarnow
109. No More Boys – Charlotte White
110. Playing Games – Eileen Hehl
111. Stolen Kisses – Elizabeth Reynolds
112. Listen to Your Heart – Marian Caudell
113. Private Eyes – Julia Winfield
114. Just the Way You Are – Janice Boies
115. Promise Me Love – Jane Redish
116. Heartbreak Hill – Carol MacBain
117. The Other Me – Terri Fields
118. Heart to Heart – Stefanie Curtis
119. Star-Crossed Love – Sharon Cadwallader
120. Mr. Wonderful – Fran Michaels
121. Only Make-Believe – Julia Winfield
122. Star in Her Eyes – Dee Daley
123. Love in the Wings – Virginia Smiley
124. More Than Friends – Janice Boies
125. Parade of Hearts – Jahnna Beecham
126. Here's My Heart – Stefanie Curtis
127. My Best Enemy – Janet Quin-Harkin
128. One Boy at a Time – Diana Gregory
129. A Vote for Love – Terri Fields
130. Dance with Me – Jahnna Beecham
131. Hand Me Down Heart – Mary Schultz
132. Winner Takes All – Laurie Lykken
133. Playing the Field – Eileen Hehl
134. Past Perfect – Fran Michaels
135. Geared for Romance – Shan Finney
136. Stand By for Love – Carol Macbain
137. Rocky Romance – Sharon Dennis Wyeth
138. Heart and Soul – Janice Boies
139. The Right Combination – Jahnna Beecham
140. Love Detour – Stefanie Curtis
141. Winter Dreams – Barbara Conklin
142. Lifeguard Summer – Jill Jarnow
143. Crazy for You – Jahnna Beecham
144. Priceless Love – Laurie Lykken
145. This Time for Real – Susan Gorman
146. Gifts from the Heart – Joanne Simbal
147. Trust in Love – Shan Finney
148. Riddles of Love – Judy Baer
149. Practice Makes Perfect – Jahnna Beecham
150. Summer Secrets – Susan Blake
151. Fortunes of Loves – Mary Schultz
152. Cross Country Match – Ann Richards
153. The Perfect Catch – Laurie Lykken
154. Love Lines – Frances H. Grimes
155. The Game of Love – Susan Gorman
156. Two Boys Too Many – Janet Adele Bloss
157. Mr Perfect – Stefanie Curtis
158. Crossed Signals – Janice Boies
159. Long Shot – Joanne Simbal
160. Blue Ribbon Romance – Virginia Smiley
161. My Perfect Valentine – Judy Baer
162. Trading Hearts – Susan Blake
163. My Dream Guy – Carla Bracale
164. Playing to Win – Janice Boies
165. A Brush With Love – Stephanie St. Pierre
166. Three's a Crowd – Alison Dale
167. Working at Love – Judy Baer
168. Dream Date – Carla Bracale Cassidy
169. Golden Girl – Jane Ballard
170. Rock 'N' Roll Sweetheart – Laurie Lykken
171. Acting On Impulse – Susan Jo Wallach
172. Sun Kissed – Stephanie St Pierre
173. Music from the Heart – Pamela Laskin
174. Love On Strikes – Janice Boies
175. Puppy Love – Carla Bracale
176. Wrong-Way Romance – Sheri Cobb South
177. The Truth About Love – Laurie Lykken
178. Project Boyfriend – Stephanie St Pierre
179. Racing Hearts – Susan Sloate
180. Opposite Attracts – Linda Joy Singleton
181. Time Out of Love – June O'Connell
182. Down With Love – Carla Bracale Cassidy
183. The Real Thing – Elisabet McHugh
184. Too Good to Be True – Susan E. Kirby
185. Focus on Love – Mandy Anson
186. That Certain Feeling – Sherri Cobb South
187. Fair-Weather Love – Carla Bracale Cassidy
188. Play Me a Love Song – Bette Headapohl
189. Cheating Heart – Laurie Lykken
190. Almost Perfect – Linda Joy Singleton
191. Backstage Romance – Kelly Kroeger
192. The Cinderella Game – Sheri Cobb South
193. Love in the Upbeat – June O'Connell
194. Lucky in Love – Eileen Hehl
195. Comedy of Errors – Diane Michele Crawford
196. Clashing Hearts – Caryn Jenner
197. The News Is Love – Lauren M. Phelps
198. Partners in Love – Susan E. Kirby
199. Wings of Love – Anne Herron Wolfe
200. Love to Spare – Linda Joy Singleton
201. His and Hers – June O'Connell
202. Love On Wheels – Sandy Jones
203. Lesson in Love – Bette Headapohl
204. Picture Perfect Romance – J. B. Cooper
205. Cowboy Kisses – Diane Michele Crawford
206. Moonlight Melody – Alicyn Watts
207. My Secret Heart – Susan E. Kirby
208. Romance on the Run – Catt Hastings
209. Weekend Romance – Peggy Teeters
210. Oh, Promise Me – Laurie Lykken
211. Dreamskate – Angela Cash
212. Highland Hearts – Maggie Hayes
213. Finders keepers – Jan Washburn
214. Don't Bet On Love – Sheri Cobb South
215. Deep in My Heart – Linda Joy Singleton
216. Careless Whispers – Sydell Voeller
217. Head Over Heels – Susan Sloate
218. Face Up to Love – Nikki Danner
219. Heartstrings – Barbara Wilson
220. My Funny Guy – Helen Santori
221. A Little More to Love – Arlene Erlbach
222. Fool for Love – Sandy Jones
223. Hearthrob – Betty Jo Schuler
224. Boyfriend Blues – Lauren M. Phelps
225. Recipe for Love – Kate Emburg
226. Aloha Love – Marcie Kremer
227. Dreamboat – Linda Joy Singleton
228. Blame It On Love – Sheri Cobb South
229. Rich in Romance – Angela Cash
230. Happily Ever After – Eileen Hehl
231. Love Notes – Janet Maxwell
232. The Love Line – Kelly Kroeger
233. Follow Your Heart – Bette Headapohl

=== Sweet Dreams Specials ===
==== Fiction ====
1. My Secret Love – Janet Quin-Harkin
2. A Change of Heart – Susan Blake
3. Searching for Love – Andrea Warren
4. Taking the Lead – Deborah Kent
5. Never Say Goodbye – Janet Quin-Harkin
6. Chance to Love – Stephanie Foster

==== Nonfiction ====
1. The Sweet Dreams Love Book: Understanding Your Feelings – Deidre S. Laiken and Alan J. Schneider
2. The Sweet Dreams Body Book: A Guide to Diet, Nutrition, and Exercise – Julie Davis
3. The Sweet Dreams Beautiful Hair Book: A Guide to Hair Care, Cuts and Styles – Courtney DeWitt
4. Sweet Dreams: How to Talk to Boys And Other Important People – Catherine Winters
5. The Sweet Dreams Fashion Book: Looking Hot Without Spending a Lot – Patricia Bozic

=== On Our Own ===
Series by Janet Quin-Harkin.

1. The Graduates
2. The Trouble With Toni
3. Out of Love
4. Old Friends, New Friends
5. Growing Pains
6. Best Friends Forever

=== Private Eyes ===
Series by Julia Winfield.

1. Partners in Crime
2. Tug of Hearts
3. On Dangerous Ground

=== Winners ===
Series by Suzanne Rand.

1. The Girl Most Likely
2. All-American Girl
3. The Good Luck Girl
