= Jamie Suzanne =

American writer

Jamie Suzanne (pseudonym) is the pen name used by multiple ghostwriters of the Sweet Valley Kids, Sweet Valley Twins, Sweet Valley Junior High, Sweet Valley High, and Sweet Valley University book series. The pseudonym is a combination of the names of Francine Pascal’s daughters. Authors known to have written as Jamie Suzanne include Louise Hawes, Linda Joy Singleton, Robynn Clairday, and Nina Kiriki Hoffman.

== Select bibliography ==
=== Sweet Valley Twins ===
- #5 - Sneaking Out (by Louise Hawes)
- #6 - The New Girl (by Louise Hawes)
- #13 - Stretching the Truth (by Louise Hawes)

=== Sweet Valley Junior High ===
- #12 - Third Wheel (by Nina Kiriki Hoffman)

=== Sweet Valley High ===
- #41 - Outcast (by Louise Hawes)

=== Sweet Valley University ===
- #24 - His Secret Past (by Robynn Clairday)
- #27 - Elizabeth and Todd Forever (by Robynn Clairday)
- #30 - Beauty and the Beach (by Robynn Clairday)
- #59 - Barnyard Battle (by Linda Joy Singleton)

== See also ==
- Sweet Valley High
