= Linda Joy Singleton =

US speculative fiction writer

- Born: October 29, 1957 (age 67); Portland, Oregon, US
- Occupation: Writer
- Period: 1995-Present
- Genre: juvenile fantasy, science fiction

Linda Joy Singleton (born October 29, 1957) is an American writer of children's books, primarily of young adult fiction. She has written a number of speculative fiction series including The Seer, Dead Girl, My Sister, the Ghost, Regeneration, and Strange Encounters. Singleton also wrote a novel in the Sweet Valley Twins series as Jamie Suzanne.

== Bibliography ==
=== Dead Girl ===
- Dead Girl Walking (2008)
- Dead Girl Dancing (2009)
- Dead Girl in Love (2009)

=== My Sister, the Ghost ===
- Twin Again (1995)
- Escape from Ghostland (1995)
- Teacher Trouble (1996)
- Babysitter Beware (1996)

=== Regeneration ===
- Regeneration (2000)
- The Search (2000)
- The Truth (2000)
- The Imposter (2000)
- The Killer (2001)

=== Strange Encounters ===
- Oh No! UFO! (2004)
- Shamrocked! (2005)
- Sea Switch (2005)

=== Standalone Novels ===
- Love Potion (2002)
- Phantom Boyfriend (2002)
- Double Vision (2003)
- Mail Order Monster (2005)
- Melissa's Mission Impossible (2005)
- Memory Girl (2016)
- The Talking Snowman (1997)
