= Nina Kiriki Hoffman =

American science fiction writer

- Hoffman at the 2026 World Fantasy Convention
- Born: March 20, 1955 (age 71); San Gabriel, California, U.S.
- Occupation: Author
- Relatives: Kristian Hoffman (brother)
- Writing career
- Period: 1975–present
- Genres: Fantasy, science fiction, horror, young adult
- Notable works: The Thread That Binds the Bones; Spirits That Walk in Shadow
- Notable awards: Stoker (1993)

Nina Kiriki Hoffman (born March 20, 1955, in San Gabriel, California) is an American fantasy, science fiction and horror writer.

== Profile ==
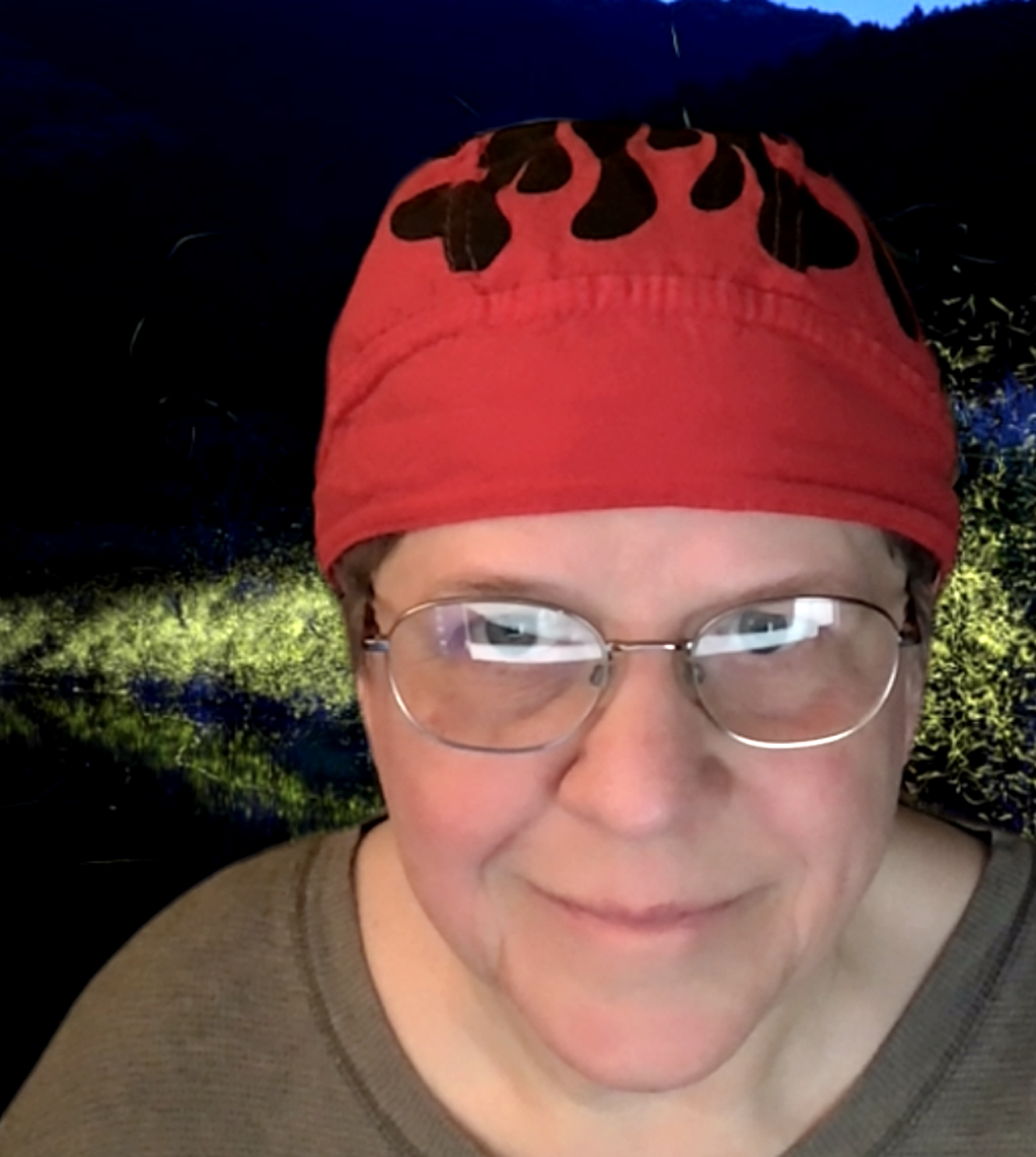
Hoffman in 2021

Hoffman started publishing short stories in 1975. Her first nationally published short story appeared in Asimov's Science Fiction magazine in 1983. She has since published over 200 in various anthologies and magazines.

Her short story "A Step Into Darkness" (1985) was one of the winners of the L. Ron Hubbard Writers of the Future award and was published in the first of the Writers of the Future anthologies.

Her second collection of short stories, Courting Disasters and Other Strange Affinities, was nominated for the 1992 Locus Award for best collection of the year.

Her novella '"Unmasking", published in 1992 by Axolotl Press, was nominated for the 1993 World Fantasy Award. Her novella "Haunted Humans" (seen in The Magazine of Fantasy & Science Fiction, July 1994) was a finalist for the 1995 Nebula Award for Best Novella and on the same ballot her novelette "The Skeleton Key" was nominated for the Nebula Award for Best Novelette. She was one of the Writer Guests of Honor at the 1996 World Horror Convention. Her short story "Trophy Wives" won the 2008 Nebula Award for Best Short Story.

Her novel, The Thread That Binds the Bones, won the Bram Stoker Award for Best First Novel. Other novels include The Silent Strength of Stones (a sequel to Thread), A Fistful of Sky, and A Stir of Bones. Her best known works are set in the Pacific Northwest and Southern California, and involve people (often entire families) with magical talents. The stories have invited comparison to Zenna Henderson and Ray Bradbury's stories on similar themes.

She has been shortlisted, awarded and finalist for awards for novella, novelette, novel, fantasy novel, adult literature, work for younger readers, young adult books, and children's literature for the Nebula, Locus, World Fantasy Award, the Theodore Sturgeon Award, the HOMer award from CompuServe, the Endeavour Award, the Mythopoeic Award, the James Tiptree Jr. Award and the Philip K. Dick Award.

Her brother is the musician Kristian Hoffman.

She lives in Eugene, Oregon. She is a member of the Wordos writers' group. In 2017, she competed in the SLUG Queen pageant in the persona of country singer "Patsy Slugtana".

As of 2020, she teaches small classes in science fiction, fantasy, and horror writing via Zoom for the Fairfield County Writers' Studio.

== Bibliography ==
=== Novels ===
- Williams, Tad; Nina Kiriki Hoffman (1992). Child of an Ancient City. New York: Atheneum.
- The Thread That Binds the Bones (1993)
- The Silent Strength of Stones (1995)
- Body Switchers from Outer Space (#14 in R.L. Stine's Ghosts of Fear Street series) 1996
- Why I'm Not Afraid of Ghosts (#23 in R.L. Stine's Ghosts of Fear Street series) 1997
- I Was A Sixth Grade Zombie (#30 in R.L. Stine's Ghosts of Fear Street series) 1998
- Echoes (Star Trek: Voyager #15) (with Kristine Kathryn Rusch and Dean Wesley Smith) 1998
- Third Wheel (part of the Sweet Valley Junior High series) as "Jamie Suzanne" (1999)
- A Red Heart of Memories (1999)
- Past the Size of Dreaming (2001)
- A Fistful of Sky (2002)
- A Stir of Bones (2003)
- Catalyst: A Novel of Alien Contact (2006) Tachyon Publications
- Spirits That Walk in Shadow (2006)
- Fall of Light (2009)
- Thresholds (2010)
- Meeting (2011)

=== Short fiction ===
Collections

- Courting Disasters and Other Strange Affinities (short story collection) (1991)
- Common Threads (collection published in limited release by Hypatia Press) (1995)
- Time Travelers, Ghosts, and Other Visitors (short story collection) (2003)
- Permeable Borders (short story collection) (2012)

Short stories

- Universal Donor (short story, originally published in Pulphouse #4) 1989
- Compandroid (short story, originally published in SF Review Vol 1 #3) 1990
- Legacy of Fire (Author's Choice Monthly #14) 1990
- Unmasking (novella) (World Fantasy Award Finalist) (1992)
- "Skeleton Key" (novelette) (Nebula Award Finalist) (1993)
- "Haunted Humans" (novella) (Nebula Award Finalist) (1994)
- "Home for Christmas" (novella) (World Fantasy Award Finalist) (1995)
- Water Everywhere (short story, published in the anthology Sorceries edited by Katharine Kerr) (1996)
- Trophy Wives (Nebula Award Finalist) 2008
- Futures in the Memories Market Clarkesworld Magazine, June 2010
- "Ghost Hedgehog" (short story) Tor.com 2011
- "Firebugs" Night Shade Books, November 2012
- Multimart Perihelion Science Fiction, July 2014
- Stillborn (short story) Borderlands Anthology #1, November 2018

Year	Title	First published	Reprinted/collected	Notes
2000	Night life	Hoffman, Nina Kiriki (Aug 2000). "Night life". F&SF. 99 (2): 78–84.		Short story

== Award nominations ==
- 1985 "A Step Into Darkness" (short story) Writers of the Future 1st quarter: 1985 Hubbard
- 1991 Courting Disasters and Other Strange Affinities (collection): 1992 Locus
- 1992 Unmasking (novella): 1993 World Fantasy
- 1993 "The Skeleton Key" (novelette): 1995 Nebula
- 1993 The Thread That Binds the Bones (first novel): 1994 Stoker Winner
- 1993 The Thread that Binds the Bones fantasy novel: 1994 Locus
- 1994 "Haunted Humans" (novella): 1995 Nebula
- 1994 "Haunted Humans" (novella): 1995 Locus
- 1994 "Haunted Humans" (novella): 1995 HOMer
- 1995 "Home for Christmas" (novelette): 1996 Nebula
- 1995 "Home for Christmas" (novella): 1996 World Fantasy
- 1995 "Home for Christmas" (short fiction): 1996 Theodore Sturgeon Memorial Award shortlist
- 1995 "Home for Christmas" (novelette): 1996 HOMer
- 1995 The Silent Strength of Stones (novel): 1996 World Fantasy
- 1995 The Silent Strength of Stones (fantasy novel): 1996 Locus/6
- 1995 The Silent Strength of Stones (novel): 1997 Nebula
- 1996 "Airborn" (novella): 1997 HOMer
- 1999 A Red Heart of Memories (novel): 2000 World Fantasy
- 1999 A Red Heart of Memories (fantasy novel): 2000 Locus
- 1999 A Red Heart of Memories finalist: 2000 Endeavour
- 2001 Past the Size of Dreaming (fantasy novel): 2002 Locus
- 2001 Past the Size of Dreaming finalist: 2002 Endeavour
- 2002 A Fistful of Sky (fantasy novel): 2003 Locus
- 2002 A Fistful of Sky (adult literature): 2003 Mythopoeic
- 2002 A Fistful of Sky short list: 2004 Tiptree
- 2003 A Stir of Bones (work for younger readers): 2004 Stoker
- 2003 A Stir of Bones (young adult book): 2004 Locus
- 2003 A Stir of Bones finalist: 2004 Endeavour
- 2003 Time Travelers, Ghosts, and Other Visitors finalist: 2004 Endeavour
- 2006 Catalyst finalist: 2007 Philip K. Dick
- 2006 Spirits That Walk in Shadow (young adult book): 2007 Locus
- 2006 Spirits That Walk in Shadow finalist: 2007 Endeavour
- 2006 Spirits That Walk in Shadow (children's literature): 2007 Mythopoeic
- 2008 "Trophy Wives" in Fellowship Fantastic (short story): 2008 Nebula Winner
