= Sweet Valley Senior Year =

Book series by Francine Pascal

Sweet Valley High Senior Year
- Author: Francine Pascal
- Country: United States
- Language: English
- Genre: Young adult fiction, Romance novel
- Publisher: Random House
- Published: 1999-2003
- Media type: Print (hardcover and paperback); Audiobook

Sweet Valley High Senior Year is part of the Sweet Valley High franchise and the last spin-off series to be published. A double edition of the final book, Sweet 18, included the first book from the SVH series, Double Love, and a letter from creator Francine Pascal.

The Senior Year series continued the earthquake plot that took place in the final Sweet Valley High books, notably that the earthquake destroyed nearby El Carro High. As a result, El Carro students were forced to transfer to Sweet Valley High and several new characters are introduced. Like the Sweet Valley Junior High series, the chapters are interspersed with "handwritten" diary pages, e-mail entries and similar that explore the characters thoughts "off screen".

The series ends when the twins graduate from high school and their story is continued in the Sweet Valley University series, where they go to university.

== Characters ==
=== Returning characters ===
Elizabeth Wakefield
Elizabeth became more outgoing as the series progressed out her desire to take risks, believing that her studious attitude has prevented her from trying things she may never have to chance to experience again, especially in aftermath of the earthquake. Though still a member of The Oracle, she experimented with drinking and moved out of her parents' home for a while. After meeting Conner McDermott in her creative writing class, they quickly develop a strong attraction to one another, despite their initial scorn for one another. Elizabeth's life becomes increasingly tumultuous as she and Conner fall in love with one another. She dated Evan Plummer briefly after her breakup with Conner, and then Jeff French. After she breaks up with Jeff on Prom Night, Elizabeth and Conner reconcile, but ultimately decide they should not be together. She would later reconcile with Todd during their coffee date and remain together prior to the Sweet Valley University.

Jessica Wakefield
An intense antagonism developed between Jessica and Melissa Fox after Jessica unknowingly kissed Melissa's boyfriend, Will Simmons, in the first book of the series. Jessica was devastated when her friends Lila and Amy sided with Melissa, and became the target of vicious rumors spread by Melissa and her clique throughout the school. However, she had a few friends who stayed by her side: notably in Annie Whitman and Jade Wu. She was able to bounce back from the gossip and became good friends with Tia Ramirez, another member of the cheerleading squad. Jessica dated Will briefly before entering a serious relationship with Jeremy Aames. They broke up once after Jessica decided to date Will again, but soon got back together. Jessica and Lila would later reconcile when she admits that she only sided with Melissa because she was jealous of the popularity Jessica has. She felt like a nobody and Melissa offered Lila a chance to get even with Jessica by joining her clique. However, her friendship with Amy remains over and that she is happy to follow Melissa's Anti-Jessica campaign. She would later gain more friends in the form of Cherie Reese and Gina Cho who felt guilty over how they treated her.

Maria Slater
Studious, hard-working Maria was also a member of The Oracle and Elizabeth's best friend. She placed a lot of pressure on herself to receive a scholarship at a good university and saw herself as slightly nerdy. She had a brief fling with Conner McDermott before starting a steady relationship with Ken Matthews. Maria was named valedictorian at the series conclusion.

Ken Matthews
Still in mourning over Olivia, a depressed Ken quit the football team, a decision he later regretted. After his new relationship with Maria slowly brought him out of his shell, Ken rejoined the team but he was made to ride the bench, as Will Simmons was the team's quarterback. Ken became quarterback again after Will was seriously injured during a game. Throughout the series, he struggles with his father's expectations for Ken to become a professional athlete after high school.

Jade Wu
Jade appeared in an early edition of Sweet Valley High as a sophomore, a timid Chinese girl who was terrified of defying her traditional father. In Senior Year she was significantly changed, and was depicted as a senior. She has become an extroverted, flirtatious cheerleader turned basketball player who lived with her single mother. Her affluent father and stepmother lived in Oregon; at one stage, Mr Wu attempted to make Jade move to Oregon with him, and even attend the University of Oregon to take up business administration. However, with encouragement from her friends, Jade is able to stand up to her father in letting her decide her own future. She dated Jeremy Aames briefly before beginning a relationship with Evan Plummer. Along with Annie Whitman, she does not side with Melissa Fox in the conflict against Jessica. Jade later becomes close friends with Elizabeth and Jessica and doesn't like Melissa and her friends. Jade's mother was a budding novelist who eventually began a series about Jade's friends, Elizabeth and Jessica, hinting that she is writing a version of Sweet Valley High.

Other
The following characters from the original series appear in minor capacity.

- Lila Fowler took Melissa's side during the Jessica/Melissa war and later admitted that she felt like she was always in Jessica's shadow. The two slowly repaired their friendship over the series. At the beginning of the series, the Wakefields (save Elizabeth, who is staying with Conner McDermott and Megan Sandborn) stay at the Fowlers' mansion while the former's house is being rebuilt after the earthquake.
- Aaron Dallas was part of the football team's clique and dated Cherie Reese. Melissa Fox tried to seduce Aaron in revenge for Cherie's perceived disloyalty. When Will confronts him for supposedly coming onto Melissa, Aaron is able to expose to Will and Cherie that it had been Melissa trying to seduce him, not vice versa.
- Annie Whitman was on the cheerleading squad with Jessica. She does not take Melissa's side in the Jessica/Melissa conflict. Annie was the only one aside Jade whom Jessica remained friends with. Annie had often come to her defense by calling Melissa, Lila and Amy out for being selfish around her. In turn, Jessica realizes how loyal of a friend she is to her. Annie became Melissa's enemy and attempted to ruin her reputation. However, Tia defends her and Jessica and threatens to have Melissa kicked out of the cheerleading squad if she doesn't behave herself.
- Amy Sutton also took Melissa's side. Unlike Lila, she and Jessica's friendship remained over. She tried to reconcile with Amy, but she rejected the efforts. She went as far as telling Jessica off that she felt like she was too much in her shadow and believed Melissa was the better friend to her. Amy was basically the only one who remained friends with Melissa after Gina and Cherie abandons her and Lila reconciled with Jessica.
- Jeffrey French, formerly a soccer star from Sweet Valley High became funky DJ Jeff in Senior Year. After revealing himself as the writer of Elizabeth's secret Valentine's Day letters, the two began dating. They broke up after Jeff lied about his university plans and maintain an awkward friendship.
- Enid Rollins is mentioned as attending the same creative writing class as Elizabeth, Conner, and Andy. She and Elizabeth drifted apart; Elizabeth later remarked that she has turned goth.
- Winston Egbert was mentioned and appears briefly in the final book in the series.
- Bruce Patman was mentioned briefly and did not appear.
- Todd Wilkins joined the football team and was respected by both El Carro and Sweet Valley students. At the end of the series, he invited Liz out for coffee to catch up. They were together when Sweet Valley University began. He dated Megan, Conner's half sister.

=== New characters ===
Conner McDermott
One of many El Carro students who transferred to Sweet Valley High, Conner was an attractive but brooding musician. He lived with his mother and younger sister Megan, of whom he was very protective. Tia Ramirez, his best friend since second grade, lived behind him, and his other close friends included Andy Marsden and Evan Plummer. When he and Elizabeth Wakefield first meet in their creative writing class, Conner's cynical expectations of who she appears to be are quickly overturned and they develop an attraction to one another despite their initial antagonism. At the beginning of the series, Conner's friends constantly remarked that he never stayed with a girl for long. After a brief fling with Maria, Conner fell for Elizabeth. They initially struggled with their feelings for each other, since Elizabeth felt guilty about pursuing Conner when her best friend was still interested in him. After they began dating, he cheated on her once by kissing Tia in Backstabber. Conner and Elizabeth's serious on-off relationship is an ongoing theme in the series. Conner developed a drinking problem and eventually agreed to go into rehab, where he met Alanna Feldman. While he intended to resume his relationship with Elizabeth, he broke up with her after learning she and Evan were in a brief relationship while he was in rehab. He dates Alanna instead, but broke up because of the strain the relationship had on his friendship with Tia, and the fact that Alanna kept lying to Conner. Conner and Elizabeth reconciled briefly on Prom Night but decided not to get back together. After the series, he is mentioned as planning to attend Belmont University after being accepted into the institution's music department.

Melissa Fox
Melissa was Will's manipulative, insecure and possessive girlfriend. She was cheerleading captain for the El Carro squad, but lost captaincy of the Sweet Valley squad to Tia Ramirez and of whom she developed a bitter rivalry. When Melissa discovered that Will had been cheating on her with Jessica Wakefield, she led a vendetta against Jessica, which included spreading vicious rumours and attempting to sabotage her cheerleading try-outs. Melissa was able to turn Lila Fowler and Amy Sutton against Jessica. However, Annie and Jade weren't swayed and called her out for hurting Jessica. Melissa was devastated when Will broke up with her for Jessica and attempted suicide. During her breakup from Will, following his football injury, she dated Ken Matthews. She and Will maintain an on-and-off relationship through the series, though they are together at the end of the series. Melissa's antagonism towards Jessica came back to haunt her when Tia and Annie informed the school about her behavior and she was kicked off the cheerleading squad. Her close friends were Cherie Reese and Gina Cho until they abandoned Melissa after feeling guilty for how they treated Jessica. The only friend who remains at Melissa's side is Amy as Lila reconciled her friendship with Jessica. However, when forced to plan a high school dance, Melissa shows Jessica respect after seeing that she refuses a date with Will since Jessica cares about Jeremy.

Will Simmons
Will was one of many El Carro High students who transferred to Sweet Valley High. Despite being involved in a serious relationship with Melissa Fox, he pursued Jessica Wakefield. His relationship with Melissa remained on/off throughout the series, and he remained attracted to Jessica, though she repeatedly turned him down after briefly dating him. A talented quarterback, Will was offered a football scholarship to University of Michigan. Unfortunately, after receiving a serious injury on the field, Will was informed that he would never be able to play football again. Although initially bitter, he later decided to become a sports reporter instead.

Tia Ramirez
Easy going, tomboyish Tia was a cheerleader at El Carro and became captain of the Sweet Valley High squad. Tia was also briefly featured in Party Weekend, the 143rd book in the original series. She is known to be popular, but not in a snobby way, and has many female and male friends. Upon entering Sweet Valley High, Tia adapts quickly and becomes friends with the Wakefield sisters, Jade, Annie and Maria Slater. One student doesn't like her, Melissa Fox, and it developed into a seeded rivalry. Tia has also warned her to behave herself if she wants to avoid being kicked out of the cheerleading squad. She lived with her parents and had many brothers. She, Conner, and Andy have been best friends since they were children and Tia and Conner are neighbors. She began the series as the long-time girlfriend of Angel Desmond. However, when he left for college, she cheated on him with Trent Maynor. She and Trent later had a steady relationship.

Jeremy Aames
Jeremy Aames was a student from Big Mesa High and captain of the football team. His best friend was teammate Trent Maynor. Jeremy was mature for his age and helped to look after his two younger sisters, especially during his family's struggles after Mr. Aames lost his job and had a heart attack. Jeremy worked with Elizabeth at the House of Java, but he meets Jessica when Elizabeth arranges for Jessica to cover her shift. He quickly fell in love with her and they begin a short-lived relationship, which ended when he caught her out with Will. A brief fling with Jade, another co-worker, followed. He and Jessica eventually reunited and remained together until the end of the series. When Mrs. Aames decided to move the family to Arizona so that her husband will be able to recover from his heart attack more fully, Jeremy decided to remain in Sweet Valley to finish his senior year.

Andy Marsden
Class clown Andy was a close friend of Conner and Tia. He has little interest in academic pursuits, so he does not seriously consider what he will do after graduating until halfway through senior year. His very brief relationship with a sophomore, Six, led him to realize that he was gay. After struggling with the realization, he came out to his friends and family, who were very accepting. Towards the end of the series he had a steady boyfriend, Dave. After graduating, he plans to become a stand-up comedian in New York to be near Dave.

Evan Plummer
Evan, a laid back environmentalist, was a good friend of Conner, Tia and Andy. He was on the SVH swim team and was dedicated to his causes. He shows an interest in Elizabeth early in the series, but pursues Jessica instead when he realized that Conner and Elizabeth were in love. His relationships with Jessica, and later Elizabeth, occur when they are on rebound and do not last. As a result, he is hesitant to accept a relationship with Jade when she expresses an interest in him after breaking up with Jeremy, though they settle down together for the rest of the series. Late in the series, his parents divorce, a sudden change which upsets Evan because he believed that his family had always been happy and stable. He plans to attend Berkeley.

Trent Maynor
Jeremy's best friend and a member of Big Mesa's football team. He first appears at a Big Mesa party, where Conner and Elizabeth catch Tia alone with him. Tia begins a brief relationship with Trent, though is guilt-ridden throughout and tries to deny dating Trent because she is in a long-distance relationship with Angel. However, when Angel surprises Tia with a sudden visit from Stanford, she is forced to admit that she has been seeing Trent and they break up after deciding long-distance isn't working for them. When Jeremy chooses to remain in Sweet Valley until the end of his senior year rather than joining his family in Arizona, he stays with Trent's family. After being accepted into college, Trent begins to lose interest in keeping up in school with the end of the year coming and becomes increasingly wild with his partying. He is forced to re-evaluate his responsibilities after getting into a car accident. Trent eventually gets together with Tia, though the relationship is strained when he expresses an interest in Jessica, which upsets both Tia and Jeremy. However, they remain together until the end of the series.

Alanna Feldman
Alanna was a girl Conner met when they are both in rehab. She came from an affluent family, but turned to drinking because she disliked the social expectations her parents placed on her. She and Conner began dating, even when counselors at the rehab clinic disapproved of their relationship. After they were released from rehab, however, Alanna and Conner's relationship did not last. When Conner learned that Elizabeth had briefly dated Evan during his time at rehab, he chose to be with Alanna instead of Liz. However, he gradually became tired of the lies she told about her life, how she strained his relationship with Tia, and Conner's lingering feelings for Elizabeth. Alanna continues to drink, unsuccessfully hiding the fact from Conner, and is resistant to her rehab counselor's attempts to help her. She and Conner break up after he learned that she lied about being accepted into Tufts in order to accompany him to Boston after graduation and how she did not mention wanting to attend UCLA.

Others

- Megan Sandborn is Conner's younger half sister, a sophomore at Sweet Valley, and she and Conner share a good relationship. She is a member of the school newspaper The Oracle, where she met Elizabeth and offered to let Liz stay at her house. She looks up to Liz as an older sister figure. Megan dated Todd Wilkins, much to Conner's disgust.
- Cherie Reese is Melissa's best friend. Like Jade, she left the cheerleading squad to join the basketball team. She dates Aaron Dallas, despite Melissa's attempt to use Aaron to get back at Will and Cherie for perceived betrayals. Her friendship with Melissa eventually ends upon realizing her manipulation and betrayal. Cherie becomes close friends with Jade and the Wakefield twins.
- Gina Cho is another of Melissa's clique, frequently seen with Cherie and antagonizing Jessica. She is a member of the cheerleading squad. Like Cherie, Gina would later feel guilty for hurting Jessica and also end her friendship with Melissa upon seeing her for who she truly is.
- Josh Radinsky and Matt Wells are close friends and teammates of Will Simmons. Josh briefly hooked up with Jade Wu and at some point, dated Lila Fowler. Early in the year, Melissa started a rumour that Jessica slept with Matt. Matt is later mentioned as dating Six Hanson. The pair hated Ken until Will reunited the football team.
- Angel Desmond was Tia's longtime boyfriend and a good friend to Conner, Andy, and Evan. As a former member of El Carro's football team, he is also acquainted with Will Simmons. Though he had been accepted into Stanford, Angel began college a semester late, as he gambled away his tuition and had to come up with more money. He broke up with Tia after catching her with Trent and later dated a girl at his college.
- Six Hanson is a sophomore girl that Andy met in an outdoor adventuring club, when he was trying to become more involved in extracurricular activities. She expressed a romantic interest in Andy and they date briefly until Andy realizes that he is gay. They remain friends and she is supportive of Andy when he struggled with telling his friends about his sexual orientation.
- Dave Niles is Andy's boyfriend, after Andy comes out. In contrast to Andy's parents, Dave has trouble informing his parents that he is gay; while his mother is very supportive, his father has more trouble accepting Dave's coming out. His father also dates Evan's mother after Evan's parents divorce. After graduating, he plans to attend Columbia University, which Andy accompanying him to New York.

== List of novels ==
#	Title	Author	Publisher	Date
1	Can't Stay Away	Francine Pascal	Random House	January 12, 1999
Liz finds herself falling in love with Conner. Melissa finds out Jessica made out with Will behind her back and starts rumors about her.
2	Say It To My Face	Francine Pascal	Random House	February 9, 1999
Melissa steals Jessica's friends and spreads nasty rumours about her. Maria gets together with Conner, which makes Liz jealous.
3	So Cool	Francine Pascal	Random House	March 9, 1999
Despite successfully turning Lila and Amy against Jessica, Melissa fails to turn Annie and Jade against her. Instead, they side against Melissa for hurting Jessica's feelings and call her out for being jealous of their friend. Their stance is supported by Melissa's long-time rival, Tia Ramirez.
4	I've Got A Secret	Francine Pascal	Random House	April 13, 1999
Jessica meets Jeremy. Tia is named cheerleading captain, to Melissa's dismay and to both Annie and Jade's joy. Conner and Liz share their first kiss, which leaves their relationship in confusion.
5	If You Only Knew	Francine Pascal	Random House	May 11, 1999
Jeremy likes Jessica, but neither of them realize they are trying to hide secrets from one another. Conner and Liz realize their feelings for one another and kiss again.
6	Your Basic Nightmare	Francine Pascal	Random House	June 1999
Conner admits he likes Liz, who is torn between her own feelings for him and her concern for Maria's feelings. Will breaks up with Melissa, who tries to commit suicide by taking 27 sleeping pills. Jeremy and Jessica share the first kiss.
7	Boy Meets Girl	Francine Pascal	Random House	July 13, 1999
Will can't leave Melissa while she's been hospitalized. Jessica and Jeremy's attempts to go on the perfect date keep going awry. Conner tries to keep his distance from Liz.
8	Maria Who?	Francine Pascal	Random House	August 10, 1999
Maria is sick of living in her older sister Nina's shadow. Jessica gets a secret admirer, but is furious to discover it's Will. She tells him to leave her alone, not wanting to ruin her newfound relationship with Jeremy and tells him off to go back to Melissa.
9	The One That Got Away	Francine Pascal	Random House	September 7, 1999
Will wants Jessica, who can't stand him after he let Melissa to ruin her. Jeremy breaks up with Jessica after seeing her and Will together. Conner and Liz must decide where their relationship will go.
10	Broken Angel	Francine Pascal	Random House	October 12, 1999
Angel has lost all his money for college from gambling. The cheerleading squad and the football team execute the Kidnap and Jessica becomes closer to Will.
11	Take Me On	Francine Pascal	Random House	November 9, 1999
Jessica and Will hook up. Conner's mom goes to rehab, but now he needs to deal with his unreliable stepfather without breaking his younger sister's heart. Angel finally leaves for college.
12	Bad Girl	Francine Pascal	Random House	December 1, 1999
Ken and Maria hook up. Elizabeth rebels against her parents. Conner rescues her from a sticky situation, bringing them face-to-face at last.
13	All About Love	Francine Pascal	Random House	January 11, 2000
Jessica and Will struggle to get along and start to miss what they had before (Jeremy and Melissa). Conner and Elizabeth wonder whether or not they can handle a "relationship." Andy tries to apply himself to improve his college prospects.
14	Split Decision	Francine Pascal	Random House	February 8, 2000
Tia considers developing a relationship with Trent while still coupled with Angel. Andy meets Six, who seems to have romantic feelings for him. Evan shows an interest in Jessica.
15	On My Own	Francine Pascal	Random House	March 7, 2000
Ken tries to deal with his uncommunicative father. Andy goes on a date with Six, but isn't sure if he really likes her.
16	Three Girls And A Guy	Francine Pascal	Random House	April 11, 2000
Conner deals with having Elizabeth, Tia, and Maria in his life.
17	Backstabber	Francine Pascal	Random House	May 9, 2000
Tia and Conner try to work out their friendship after sharing a kiss.
18	As If I Care	Francine Pascal	Random House	June 13, 2000
Jessica grows jealous when Jeremy and Jade begin dating. But it's the least of her problems when she grows concerned over Elizabeth and Will.
19	It's My Life	Francine Pascal	Random House	July 11, 2000
Conner is frustrated with everyone trying to stop him from drinking.
20	Nothing Is Forever	Francine Pascal	Random House	August 8, 2000
Will is about to secure his scholarship to the University of Michigan, but is badly injured during a game.
21	The It Guy	Francine Pascal	Random House	September 12, 2000
Maria is scared of losing Ken, and then they break-up. Ken becomes the star of the football team again.
22	So Not Me	Francine Pascal	Random House	October 10, 2000
Jade tries to deal with her feelings for Jeremy.
23	Falling Apart	Francine Pascal	Random House	November 14, 2000
Conner returns to apologize to his friends and agrees to go to rehab. Liz turns to Evan for support.
24	Never Let Go	Francine Pascal	Random House	December 12, 2000
Jessica and Jeremy patch things up. Will breaks up with Melissa, who gets together with Ken.
25	Straight Up	Francine Pascal	Random House	January 9, 2001
Tia and Maria compete for a college scholarship.
26	Too Late	Francine Pascal	Random House	February 13, 2001
Jade is angry when her estranged father seeks custody of her. With her friends' help, she stands up to her father again, who agrees to respect her wishes. Jessica and Jeremy try to work out their relationship.
27	Playing Dirty	Francine Pascal	Random House	March 13, 2001
Will decides to exact revenge on Ken for stealing his scholarship and Melissa. Jessica is concerned about Will's behavior and tries to talk some sense with him. Jade and Evan get together after some initial misunderstandings.
28	Meant To Be	Francine Pascal	Random House	April 10, 2001
Conner comes back from rehab. Andy and Tia win trip to New York on a TV show.
29	Where We Belong	Francine Pascal	Random House	May 8, 2001
Conner tells Liz about Alanna, but a number of relationships fall apart when the truth about how Evan and Liz dated while Conner was in rehab finally comes out. Meanwhile, Ken succeeds in getting back together with Maria.
30	Close To You	Francine Pascal	Random House	June 12, 2001
Jeremy and Jessica try to figure out what will happen to their relationship after graduation.
31	Stay Or Go	Francine Pascal	Random House	July 10, 2001
Jeremy's family decides to move to Arizona, and he is conflicted between his loyalty to them and his relationship with Jessica
32	Road Trip	Francine Pascal	Random House	August 14, 2001
Jeremy, Conner, and Evan head to Phoenix for spring break, but Evan impulsively decides to take a detour to Vegas instead.
33	Me, Me, Me	Francine Pascal	Random House	September 11, 2001
Liz decides to make herself her top priority and earns an internship at a well-known news magazine. However, she can't avoid her responsibilities to her family when Jessica needs her help again.
34	Troublemaker	Francine Pascal	Random House	October 9, 2001
Jessica thinks she has feelings for Tia's boyfriend after they almost kissed, but finds out she still has feelings for Will. Jeremy breaks up with Jessica.
35	Control Freak	Francine Pascal	Random House	November 13, 2001
Alanna gets mad when Conner starts to control her life.
36	Tearing Me Apart	Francine Pascal	Random House	December 11, 2001
Evan is devastated when his parents decide to divorce.
37	Be Mine	Francine Pascal	Random House	January 8, 2002
Liz gets a secret admirer. Tia and Trent get back together. Will cheats on Melissa.
38	Get A Clue	Francine Pascal	Random House	February 12, 2002
Tia doesn't know what to do when she goes to college. Liz's secret admirer is Jeffrey French. Will and Melissa break up.
39	Best Of Enemies	Francine Pascal	Random House	March 12, 2002
When Melissa's friends turn against her for how she treated them and how remorseful they feel towards Jessica, she finds herself alone and out of the SVH cheerleading squad. Jessica unexpectedly feels sympathetic towards her when they're forced to plan a school dance together. Despite Will's attempt to reconcile with Jessica, she refuses and Melissa eventually shows her some respect. With Andy's encouragement, Dave comes out.
40	Never Give Up	Francine Pascal	Random House	April 9, 2002
Alanna runs away to Chicago after getting fed up with her parents.
41	He's Back	Francine Pascal	Random House	May 14, 2002
Conner breaks up with Alanna. Liz thinks Conner likes her.
42	Touch And Go	Francine Pascal	Random House	June 11, 2002
Alanna and Conner reconcile amidst tension in Alanna's house. She gets a friendly AA sponsor named Sandra.
43	It Takes Two	Francine Pascal	Random House	July 9, 2002
Melissa and Will get back together. Jessica organizes the anniversary dinner for her parents and is mad when Liz gets credit for it. When Liz learns just how hard Jessica worked for their parents and out of loyalty, she convinces Ned and Alice to give Jessica the proper credit she deserves. Realizing how much Jessica has grown from her immature conniving ways, Ned and Alice apologize to her.
44	Cruise Control	Francine Pascal	Random House	August 13, 2002
Trent gets a new car and takes a serious risk when driving.
45	Tia In The Middle	Francine Pascal	Random House	September 10, 2002
Tia is frustrated with Conner staying together with Alanna. Sick of Alanna's lies, Conner finally breaks up with her.
46	Prom Night	Francine Pascal	Random House	October 8, 2002
Andy and Dave decide to go to New York. Tia and Trent are named Prom King and Queen. Liz finds out Jeff lied about getting into NYU and breaks up with him. She reconciles with Conner.
47	Senior Cut Day	Francine Pascal	Random House	November 12, 2002
The gang go to an amusement park for Cut Day. Evan and Jessica get put in a movie. Conner tells Liz they are not right for each other. Meanwhile, Ken forgets about Cut Day and attends class, where he begins to consider some career options.
48	Sweet 18	Francine Pascal	Random House	January 14, 2003
Liz decides to hold a birthday party for the twins' birthday and is accepted into Oxford. Jessica is stressed out with the impending changes coming with graduation. Liz and Jess finally decide to go to SVU.
