= Louise Hawes =

American novelist

Louise Hawes is an American academic and author of more than a dozen novels and several short story collections.

== Career ==
Hawes first found success on the author team for the Sweet Valley Twins series, where she wrote under the pen name Jamie Suzanne.

She has been writer in residence at the University of New Mexico and the Mississippi University for Women, and a John Grisham visiting writer at the University of Mississippi. She has been a guest lecturer at the University of South Florida, Staten Island College, the University of North Carolina at Chapel Hill, the University of North Carolina at Charlotte, Meredith College, and Duke University.

Winner of the New Jersey Author’s Award and two fellowships from the New Jersey Council on the Arts, Hawes helped set up the nation's only MFA Program in Writing for Children and Young Adults at Vermont College, and teaches on the faculty there. Her appearances as guest author, lecturer, and teacher have included sessions for the American Library Association, the National Council of Teachers of English, Associated Writing Programs, and the U.S. Department of Education.

== Works ==
=== Adult works ===
- Anteaters Don't Dream and Other Stories (1st ed.). Jackson: University Press of Mississippi. 2007. ISBN 978-1-57806-938-5.
  - Story collection for adults – featured in NC Literary Review 2008
- Black Pearls, a Faerie Strand (Houghton Mifflin, 2008), a collection of dark fairy tales for adults; illustrated by Rebecca Guay
- A Flight of Angels (DC Comics/Vertigo, 2011), a graphic novel for adults, written in collaboration with Holly Black, Bill Willingham, et al.; illustrated by Rebecca Guay

=== Young adult and middle grade novels ===
- Rosey in the Present Tense (Walker Books, 2000)
  - Children’s Book Council Best Book of the Year and YALSA Popular Paperback
- Waiting for Christopher (Candlewick, 2002)
  - New York Public Library Best Book for the Teen Age and the first campus-wide Reading Initiative Novel at the Mississippi University for Women
- The Vanishing Point: A Story of Lavinia Fontana. Boston: Houghton Mifflin. 2004. ISBN 978-0-618-43423-7.
  - nominated for the 2006 YA Best Books of the Year list, a Bank Street College pick, and a Booksense Independent Booksellers Association choice
- The Language of Stars (1st ed.). New York: Margaret K. McElderry Books. 2016. ISBN 978-1-4814-6241-9., a novel written in three formats: prose, poetry, and play scripts
- Big Rig (1st ed.). Atlanta: Peachtree. 2022. ISBN 978-1-68263-252-9., a novel for middle-grade readers, featuring a protagonist who insists on a story that never ends

=== Short fiction ===
Her short fiction has been included in Prentice Hall's fiction text The Reader Writes the Story (1995), Simon & Schuster's Love and Sex: Ten Stories of Truth (2001), Such a Pretty Face (Abrams, 2007), Be Careful What You Wish For (Scholastic, 2007), and Things I'll Never Say, Short Stories about Our Secret Selves (Candlewick/Walker Books, 2015). Individual stories have also appeared in the journals Other Voices, The Southerner, and Pisgah Review.

== See also ==
- List of young adult authors
