= Jahnna N. Malcolm =

American authors (born 1953 & 1952)

Jahnna N. Malcolm is the pen name of Jahnna Beecham (born March 30, 1953, in Wichita, Kansas) and Malcolm Hillgartner (born February 4, 1952, in Indianapolis, Indiana). They are American authors of over 130 works of juvenile and young adult fiction, most notably the series "The Jewel Kingdom" (Scholastic, 1997), and "Bad News Ballet" (Scholastic, 1989). They also wrote the best-selling juvenile horror books "Scared Stiff" (Scholastic, 1991) and "Scared to Death" (Scholastic, 1992). They have won several awards including a Parent's Choice award. Their books have been translated into French, Italian, Indonesian, Polish, Spanish and Norwegian.

== Background ==
Jahnna Beecham and Malcolm Hillgartner met in 1978, when they were actors with the Oregon Shakespeare Festival in Ashland, Oregon. They were married March 2, 1981, on the stage of the Empty Space Theatre in Seattle, Washington. Robert Fulghum, author of “Everything I Need to Know I Learned in Kindergarten” and a Unitarian minister, performed the ceremony. Throughout their lives they have continued to work in regional and international theatre as actors, directors, and playwrights. Malcolm is also a well received audiobook narrator. Beecham wrote her first book, “See the USA With Your Resume” (published by Samuel French in 1983) with Zoaunne LeRoy and Adale O’Brien. She and Malcolm began their writing collaboration while Jahnna was writing five Sweet Dreams romances (Cloverdale Press, published by Bantam). When Scholastic published Beecham and Hillgartner's first book series written together, Bad News Ballet, they chose the pen name Jahnna N. Malcolm, because as Hillgartner said (quotation cited): “That’s what everyone calls us. And it’s easier for kids to remember one name.”

Beecham and Hillgartner have a son, Dashiell, born in Salem, Virginia in 1989, and a daughter, Skye, born in Kalispell, Montana in 1991. Their parenting experiences resulted in the humorous parenting column, The Jahnna and Malcolm Show: A Family Journal, which appeared weekly in Sesame Street Parents Magazine and CTW Online in 1999. The columns were eventually combined in the book “I'm Counting to 10...” (Sorin Books, 2001), which won a Parent's Choice Silver Honor in 2001. Since 1994 they have lived in southern Oregon, where they continue to write books for readers of all ages and musicals. Their musicals, Chaps! (1995) and Dog Park: The Musical (2008, book and lyrics by JNM with Michael J. Hume; songs by Malcolm Hillgartner) are published by Samuel French. Their most recent musical, Holmes and Watson Save the Empire (book and lyrics by JNM; songs by Malcolm Hillgartner) premiered at the Milwaukee Repertory Theater, Wisconsin on November 14, 2009.

== Awards ==
- Burbank International Children's Film Festival 2001: Best Drama- “The Ruby Princess Runs Away”
- Parent's choice 2001: Non-Fiction Silver Honor- "I’m Counting to Ten…"
- Audiofile Earphones award: Malcolm Hillgartner's narration of "Cheever: a Life" by Blake Bailey

== Book Series ==
Bad News Ballet (Scholastic)

1. Drat! We're Rats!, original title, The Terrible Tryouts (1989, ISBN 978-0-590-41915-4)
2. Battle of the Bunheads (1989, ISBN 978-0-590-41916-1)
3. Stupid Cupids (1989, ISBN 978-0-590-42474-5)
4. Who Framed Mary Bubnik? (1989, ISBN 978-0-590-42472-1)
5. Blubberina (1989, ISBN 978-0-590-42888-0)
6. Save D.A.D. (1990, ISBN 978-0-590-42889-7)
7. Camp Clodhopper (1990, ISBN 978-0-590-43396-9)
8. The King and Us (1990, ISBN 978-0-590-43395-2)
9. Boo Who? (1991, ISBN 978-0-590-43397-6)
10. A Dog Named Toeshoe (1990, ISBN 978-0-590-43398-3)

Hart & Soul (Bantam Books)

1. Kill the Story (September, 1989, ISBN 0553279696)
2. Play Dead (September, 1989, ISBN 0553280066)
3. Speak No Evil (July, 1990, ISBN 0553280775)
4. Get the Picture (August, 1990, ISBN 0553280775)
5. Too Hot to Handle (July, 1991, ISBN 055328262X)
6. Signed, Sealed, Delivered (July, 1991, ISBN 0553283146)
7. House of Fear (September, 1991, ISBN 0553283928)
8. Run for Your Life (September, 1991, ISBN 055328794X)

Rock ‘N Rebels (Bantam Books)

- Makin' the Grade (1991, ISBN 0553159550)
- Sticking Together (1991, ISBN 0553159569)

Rebel Angels, with Laura Young (HarperCollins)

- Rebel Angels (1996, ISBN 0061064378)
- Winging It (1996, ISBN 0061064386)
- Fly Away Home (1996, ISBN 0061064394)
- Cloud Nine (1996, ISBN 0061064408)

The Jewel Kingdom (Scholastic)

1. The Ruby Princess Runs Away (1997, ISBN 978-0-590-21283-0)
2. The Sapphire Princess Meets a Monster (1997, ISBN 0059021284)
3. The Emerald Princess Plays a Trick (1997, ISBN 978-0-590-21287-8)
4. The Diamond Princess Saves the Day (1997, ISBN 978-0-590-21289-2)
5. The Ruby Princess Sees a Ghost (1998, ISBN 978-0-590-11713-5)
6. The Sapphire Princess Hunts for Treasure (1998, ISBN 978-0-590-11714-2)
7. The Emerald Princess Finds a Fairy (1998, ISBN 978-0-590-11738-8)
8. The Diamond Princess and the Magic Ball (1998, ISBN 978-0-590-11739-5)
9. The Ruby Princess and the Baby Dragon (1998, ISBN 978-0-590-97877-4)
10. The Sapphire Princess Helps a Mermaid (1999, ISBN 978-0-590-97878-1)
11. The Emerald Princess Follows a Unicorn (1999, ISBN 978-0-590-97879-8)
12. The Diamond Princess Steps through the Mirror (1999, ISBN 978-0-590-97880-4)
13. Super Special #1: The Jewel Princesses and the Missing Crown (1998, ISBN 978-0-590-37705-8)

The Strange Museum of Lost and Found (Hooked on Phonics—Master Reader)

- The Midnight Ride (2003, ISBN 1931020086)
- Pirate's Revenge (2003, ISBN 1931020094)
- Men in Green (2003, ISBN 1931020108)
- The Royal Switch (2003, ISBN 1931020116)

Love Letters (Simon Pulse)

- Perfect Strangers (2005, ISBN 1416900462)
- Mixed Messages (2005, ISBN 0689872224)
- The Write Stuff (2005, ISBN 0689872232)
- Message in a Bottle (2005, ISBN 0689872240)

== Selected Single Titles ==
- Scared Stiff (Scholastic: 1991, ISBN 0590449966)
- Scared To Death (Scholastic: 1991, ISBN 0590552171)
- The Slime That Ate Crestview (Scholastic: 1992, ISBN 0590458523)
- Freak Show (Scholastic: 1992, ISBN 0590458531)
- Aries: Secret Identity (HarperCollins/Zodiac: 1995, ISBN 0006750443)
- Taurus: Black Out (HarperCollins/Zodiac: 1995, ISBN 0006750494)
- Gemini: Mirror Image (HarperCollins/Zodiac: 1995, ISBN 0006750508)
- Cancer: Dark Shadows (HarperCollins/Zodiac: 1995, ISBN 0006750516)
- Leo: Stage Fright (HarperCollins/Zodiac: 1995, ISBN 0061062715)
- Virgo: Desperately Yours (HarperCollins/Zodiac: 1995, ISBN 0061062685)
- Libra: Into The Light (HarperCollins/Zodiac: 1995, ISBN 0061062693)
- Scorpio: Death Grip (HarperCollins/Zodiac: 1995, ISBN 0061062707)
- Sagittarius: Strange Destiny (HarperCollins/Zodiac: 1995, ISBN 0006750478)
- Capricorn: Don't Look Back (HarperCollins/Zodiac: 1995, ISBN 0006750567)
- Aquarius: Second Sight (HarperCollins/Zodiac: 1995, ISBN 0006750486)
- Pisces: Sixth Sense (HarperCollins/Zodiac: 1995, ISBN 000675046X)
- Spirit of the West (Grolier/Scholastic: 1996, ISBN 0590068660)
- Stallion of Box Canyon (Grolier/Scholastic: 1997, ISBN 0836822838)
- I'm Counting to 10... (Sorin Books, 2001, ISBN 1893732258)
