= The Seer (novel series) =

- Author: Linda Joy Singleton
- Language: English
- Genre: Young adult
- Publisher: Llewellyn Publications
- Publication date: September 8, 2004
- Media type: Print
- Pages: 288 pp (paperback)
- ISBN: 0-7387-0526-8
- Followed by: Last Dance

The Seer Series is a paranormal young adult book series written by American novelist Linda Joy Singleton. There are six books in the series, the first being Don't Die Dragonfly. The first five books are published by Llewellyn Publications, but the last is published by Flux. Witch Ball, the third book in the series was selected as a Young Adult Library Services Association (YALSA) Quick Pick in 2007.

== Plot summary ==
=== Don't Die Dragonfly ===
After being expelled from her old school because of her psychic gift Sabine Rose moves in with her grandmother Nona who also has a "gift". Sabine tries to hide her psychic powers from her family and friends, but has a hard time coming off as a normal teen when her psychic guide Opal always seems to be present in her mind. She has a job in the school newspaper, and her best friend Penny-Love is a cheerleader. Opal tells Sabine that an unnamed girl is in danger, and keeps showing her visions of a dragonfly tattoo. Because of this Sabine is accused of a crime she did not commit.

=== Last Dance ===
Sabine is worried about her grandmother Nona, who is suffering from a memory illness. In order to find a cure for her grandmother she travels to Pine Peaks with her new goth friend Thorn. A ghost named Chloe haunts Sabine's dreams and she must help her rest in peace, and once Sabine is in Pine Peaks her dreams become more pressing. Saving Chloe gets in the way of Sabine's original plans, but her grandmothers illness is not forgotten.

=== Witch Ball ===
Sabine is on a search for charms, in order to find the book that will help her grandmother. She has two so far and is looking for the third. She brings back a witch ball that was given to her from the relative in Pine Peaks, but her grandmother believes it to be cursed. The witch ball keeps showing up when Sabine tries to avoid it, and it has caused strange things to happen. After a mishap in getting the wrong ball for a psychic booth at a carnival, the witch ball predicts Sabine's death. She must figure out what it means before it is too late.

=== Sword Play ===
The spirit of the teen who Sabine tried to save at her old school, Kip, is telling Sabine to "Help him". At her mothers orders Sabine must move back to her own home. She reunites with her old fencing club friends, which brings up memories of her getting kicked out of school, and a betrayal by her best friend Brianne. Kip's ghost continues to warn Sabine of someone who is in trouble. It leads her to investigate the accident that killed Kip, and a dangerous duel.

=== Fatal Charm ===
Sabine goes back to living with her ill grandmother Nona, and is reunited with her friends from high school. She learns that her father has another daughter, but wants nothing to do with her half-sister Jade. Without meaning to Sabine spies on Jade, and witnesses a murder. Sabine is distracted by her grandmothers poor health and is in a rush to find the cure. Sabine has puzzling feelings for two different boys and her resentment towards her dad is growing. When the killer from the murder she saw turns out to be real, she has to turn to the person she trusts the least.

=== Magicians Muse ===
Sabine's life seems to have gone back to normal. Her grandmother is well, she has a new boyfriend and she loves her friends. But her psychic abilities are put to the test when her ex-boyfriend has mysteriously gone missing. While looking for clues she runs into Jade and they get into a fight. Jade tries calling Sabine, but her calls are ignored. Sabine finds out later that now Jade has gone missing too. Also a private investigator shows up asking about Dominic's past, and he talks about leaving. Sabine finally hears from Jade and a plan is made for them to switch places, but it puts her in great danger.

== Characters ==
Sabine Main character of the story, she has a psychic ability that runs in her family. She has Blond hair and a single streak of black hair that is a characteristic of a psychic. She tries to hide her ability from her friends and family, because it got her kicked out of her last school.

Nona Is the grandmother of Sabine. Nona also has a psychic gift, and uses it for her dating service. She had a memory illness throughout the books, but is better by the last.

Opal Sabine's spirit guide who appears in Sabine's head and dreams. She often helps Sabine but gives her clues or riddles instead of straight forward answers.

Dominic A boy who Nona hired as help for around the house. He has a mysterious past, and becomes a love interest for Sabine.

Josh He becomes Sabine's boyfriend at the end of the first book. He likes magic and hopes to become a successful magician. But he breaks up with her after he sees her with a group performing a seance.

Thorn She becomes one of Sabine's close friends throughout the series. She wears a lot of black and pretends that she does not really care for Sabine, but she is kind hearted.

Penny-Love Sabine's cheerleader best friend. She loves to gossip and talk to Sabine about her boy problems.

Manny Another friend of Sabine's. He works for the school newspaper and writes the column "Mystic Manny". He has Sabine help him with his predictions for the paper. And he uses his many connections to help Sabine when she needs it.

== Critical reception ==
Overall the book series seems to have a following of younger readers. The third book in the series was chosen as a YALSA quick pick in 2007. An article in the School Library Journal Reviews says that the book starts off slow but speeds up after a few chapters. The story is average for the genre but some parts are plenty poetic and help set the mood. Kliatt reviews said that the books were "Tingly and otherworldly."

== Titles in the Series ==
- Don't Die Dragonfly, the first in the series published by Llewellyn September 8, 2004.
- Last Dance, published by, Llewellyn June 8, 2005.
- Witch Ball, published by, Llewellyn January 8, 2006.
- Sword Play, published by, Llewellyn May 8, 2006.
- Fatal Charm, published by, Llewellyn August 8, 2007.
- Magician's Muse, published by Flux, October 8, 2010.
