= Sweet Valley Twins =

Book series

- Author: Francine Pascal
- Country: United States
- Language: English
- Genre: Young adult fiction, romance novel
- Publisher: Random House
- Published: 1986
- Media type: Print (hardcover and paperback); Audiobook

Sweet Valley Twins (also known as Sweet Valley Twins and Friends) was the first spin-off to originate from Sweet Valley High, and was created by Francine Pascal and written by Jamie Suzanne. Published by Bantam Books on 1 July 1986, the series starts with the twins wanting to differ from each other. They begin to dress differently; Elizabeth moves into her own room and starts up a sixth-grade newspaper; and Jessica starts wearing make-up and becomes a member of the Unicorn Club.

== Main characters ==
Elizabeth Wakefield is the elder twin, born four minutes before Jessica. She enjoys reading (her favorite books are Amanda Howard mysteries) and writing, and hopes to become a journalist someday. She likes to concentrate on her school work and spend time with her friends. She writes for the sixth-grade newspaper, The Sixers, which she helped found. Elizabeth always helps Jessica out of her problems. She's often referred to as the reliable, more serious twin. Todd Wilkins is her constant love interest throughout the series.

Jessica Wakefield is the complete opposite of her twin; she loves gossip, boys, and fashion. She prefers to hang out with the other members of the Unicorn Club, a club consisting of the prettiest and most popular girls at their school. She is a member of the Boosters, the school's cheerleading squad, and often gets into trouble. She usually ends up concocting ridiculous schemes, and drags Elizabeth along with her. Aaron Dallas is her constant love interest throughout the series. She also likes Johnny Buck cassettes.

Jessica and Elizabeth are equally popular. They are described as having long golden hair, blue-green eyes, a tan, and a dimple on the left cheek.

== Recurring characters ==
- Ned and Alice Wakefield, the parents of eldest son Steven and identical twin daughters Elizabeth and Jessica
- Steven Wakefield, the twins' older brother
- Lila Fowler, Jessica's best friend and biggest enemy, member of the Unicorn Club and from the joint-richest family in Sweet Valley
- Todd Wilkins, Elizabeth's sort-of boyfriend, and her first kiss
- Winston Egbert, the class clown, and only male member of the Boosters
- Ken Matthews, a short boy on the basketball team and Amy's love interest
- Caroline Pearce, the school gossip
- Charlie Cashman, a trouble-maker in the twins' class
- Mr. Bowman, the twins' English teacher and supervisor for The Sixers; Elizabeth's favorite teacher
- Mrs. Arnette, the twins' history teacher; called the "Hairnet" due to her ever-present hairnet
- Tom McKay, a good-looking student who captures the attention of all the girls in school
- Melissa McCormick, friend of Elizabeth. After her mother died, she and her brother tried to survive by themselves but after finding they couldn't, they lived with their father. She later became good friends with Lila after helping her when she thought she had lost her money.
- Denny Jacobson, Janet Howell's love interest
- Jake Hamilton, Lila's love interest
- Anna Reynolds, a deaf girl who moves to Sweet Valley late in the series
- Peter Jeffries, Mandy Miller's love interest
- Mandy Miller, a close friend of Jessica's who wanted to become a member of the Unicorn Club. She was initially snubbed, but gained acceptance with Jessica's help after Mandy was diagnosed with cancer.
- Lois Waller, a shy, overweight student who was once friends with popular student Janet Howell
- Shellae Mueller, enemy of the twins; burned their pom-poms; easily identified by her clipboard and three-inch stiletto heels
- Bruce Patman, a rich, handsome, selfish and extremely arrogant student. Great tennis player and doesn't like to lose. From the joint-richest family in Sweet Valley.
- Aaron Dallas, Jessica's sort-of boyfriend although she is seen having crushes on many other boys
- Amy Sutton, Elizabeth's best friend and one of the writers for The Sixers; the only member of The Boosters (besides Winston Egbert) who isn't a Unicorn
- Rick Hunter, Mary's love interest
- Julie Porter, friend of Elizabeth and member of the writing staff of The Sixers; a talented musician and piano player
- Johanna Porter, Julie's older sister, and also a friend of Elizabeth. Musically talented, and revealed to be a good singer.
- Peter DeHaven, one of the smartest boys in Sweet Valley Middle School
- Maria Slater, close friend of Elizabeth; a former child star
- Daniel Ross-Jones, Jessica's science teacher who helps her reach her full potential
- Brooke Dennis, friend of the twins, initially hated when she arrived at Sweet Valley, but Elizabeth showed everyone why she was so bitter. Her mother is a famous pop star.
- Belinda Layton, the best female athlete in school and a member of the Unicorn Club
- Ellen Riteman, a close friend of Jessica and a member of the Unicorn Club
- Janet Howell, Lila Fowler's cousin, and president of the popular girl's club, the Unicorn Club. Extremely snobbish and a former friend of Lois Waller.
- Betsy Gordon, a member of the Unicorn Club
- Tamara Chase, a member of the Unicorn Club
- Grace Oliver, a member of the Unicorn Club
- Robin, the twins' cousin
- Mary Wallace (formerly Giaccio, then Robinson and now Wallace), one of the few members of the Unicorn Club who is close friend with both Elizabeth and Jessica. In book 7 (Three's A Crowd), a foster child, she discovered she had been kidnapped when she was a baby. She later lived with her birth mother and her birth mother's husband.
- Ginny Lu Culpepper, niece of one of the twin's teachers, Mrs. Waldron. At first mocked by the more popular girls, she discovers her strengths in whittling and taking care of horses.
- Nora Mercandy, granddaughter of a former stage magician, who was incapacitated with a stroke. She is tormented and teased by Jessica and her snobby friends, until they realize the truth.
- Sophia Rizzo, close friend of Elizabeth. Initially thought to be a bad influence because her older brother was, but Elizabeth proved she wasn't. Sarah Thomas' stepsister.
- Kimberly Haver, member of the Unicorn Club; just as snobby as Janet Howell
- Randy Mason, one of the smartest boys at Sweet Valley Middle School
- Sarah Thomas, friend of Elizabeth; had been unintentionally neglected by her father and his younger girlfriend, Annie Mapleton. She originally hated Sophia Rizzo when their parents decided to get married, but accepted her as her stepsister.
- Kerry Glenn, who takes ballet classes with the twins and others

== Books ==
1. Best Friends: The twins start Sweet Valley Middle School and find they're growing apart!
2. Teacher's Pet: The twins start ballet class and compete for a solo. Jessica is the better dancer but Elizabeth is the teacher's pet!
3. The Haunted House: The old Mercandy mansion is considered haunted. When Nora Mercandy moves in with her grandparents, the kids at school treat her badly. But is the house haunted?
4. Choosing Sides: Amy wants to be on the Boosters. but Elizabeth learns the Unicorns will do anything to keep her off the squad, including Jessica! Whose side should she take?
5. Sneaking Out: The twins' parents say they're too young for the Johnny Buck concert, but nothing will stop Jessica from going.
6. The New Girl: Brooke moves to Sweet Valley, and everyone hates her. The twins pretend to be triplets, and soon the whole school is ready to pull the best prank ever. But Liz discovers the reason that Brooke is so mean, and the prank doesn't seem too good an idea after all.
7. Three's a Crowd: The twins' friend Mary starts acting like their sister, and they all discover a big secret.
8. First Place: Lila has a horse and Elizabeth sucks up to her to spend time with it.
9. Against the Rules: Everyone thinks Sophia Rizzo is big trouble. When Elizabeth is told she can't be friends with her, she decides to go against all the rules.
10. One of the Gang: Jessica is the chairperson of the "Olympics" at school. After spraining her ankle, she tries to implement non-athletic events into the competition.
11. Buried Treasure: Jessica and Ellen find buried treasure.
12. Keeping Secrets: The twins' father teaches them a secret language passed down in the family, but they both have trouble keeping it a secret.
13. Stretching the Truth: Mary lies to impress her friends, but when they decide to surprise her and the lies start to unravel, she regrets it.
14. Tug of War: Elizabeth and Jessica run against each other for sixth-grade president.
15. The Older Boy: Jessica pretends to be 15 to get a high school boy to go out with her, and ends up on a double date with his brother.
16. Second Best: Tom McKay's older brother Dylan feels outdone by his younger brother, especially when an essay contest is announced at school.
17. Boys Against Girls: The twins and their friends decide to take matters into their own hands when their new homeroom teacher turns out to be a complete sexist!
18. Center of Attention: Alice Wakefield is ill and Jess thinks it's much worse. When she gets sympathy from everyone she lets her imagination run wild, but Elizabeth and Steven think she's taking it too far.
19. The Bully: Dennis Cookman is a massive bully, and the school teams up to teach him a lesson.
20. Playing Hooky: Jessica gets in trouble for skipping school, and both she and Elizabeth feel the repercussions.
21. Left Behind: Sarah's father's fiancée is horrible! She wants to tell her friends but Annie has scared her into keeping silent.
22. Out of Place: Ginny Lu arrives in Sweet Valley but finds it difficult to make friends, until Liz comes to her rescue.
23. Claim to Fame: The twins fight to have their memories preserved in a school time capsule.
24. Jumping to Conclusions: Is the twins' mother having an affair?
25. Standing Out: Billie Layton, Sweet Valley Middle School's biggest tomboy, is going through some major changes in her life. Not only is she becoming aware of her physical development, but she realizes that boys can be more than buddies.
26. Taking Charge: When Patrick Morris's parents forbid him to do anything other than school work, he thinks they are ruining his life and decides to run away. Will his parents find him before he gets into serious trouble?
27. Teamwork: The twins and Ken dog-sit. But when they find that the dog has been abused, they don't know what to do.
28. April Fool!: When the twins switch places, their April Fools' Day trick doesn't go as planned.
29. Jessica & the Brat Attack: Jessica takes a baby-sitting job without Elizabeth's consent, then realizes how horrible the kids are.
30. Princess Elizabeth: Elizabeth's pen-pal from Santa Dora comes to Sweet Valley... and he's a prince!
31. Jessica's Bad Idea: Jessica gives Sandra Ferris a makeover, then decides it's a bad idea when Sandra becomes the class "darling."
32. Jessica on Stage: Jessica gets the lead role in a play.
33. Elizabeth's New Hero: The twins meet and befriend a member of the visiting East Germany Boys' Gymnastics team.
34. Jessica, the Rock Star: Jessica joins a band formed by Bruce and other boys at school, and tries to imitate a famous singer without realizing she sounds terrible singing.
35. Amy's Pen Pal: Amy's pen pal Samantha from San Francisco seems to be too good to be true.
36. Mary is Missing: No one at school knows where Mary is, and cryptic clues left behind seem to indicate she has been kidnapped!
37. The War Between the Twins: The Unicorns start their own newspaper which goes head-to-head with The Sixers.
38. Lois Strikes Back: Lois Waller decides to teach her bully Bruce a lesson.
39. Jessica & the Money Mix-up: Jess loses her father's charity money.
40. Danny Means Trouble: Elizabeth tries to help Danny from being kicked off the track team, but he doesn't want help.
41. The Twins Get Caught: The twins get caught sneaking out.
42. Jessica's Secret: When Elizabeth starts her period before Jess, Jessica sees a trip to their cousins' as a chance to prove she is the more mature one.
43. Elizabeth's First Kiss: Elizabeth and Jess both like Todd.
44. Amy Moves In: Amy's house burns down and she moves in with the Wakefields
45. Lucy Takes the Reins: Elizabeth helps Lucy Benson get back on the horse, literally.
46. Mademoiselle Jessica: Jessica takes a competition to win a trip to Paris a bit too far.
47. Jessica's New Look: Jessica has to get glasses.
48. Mandy Miller Fights Back: Mandy wants to be a part of the Unicorns, but only Jess likes her. Everything seems less important when she is diagnosed with cancer.
49. The Twins' Little Sister: The twins take care of their neighbors' daughter and find it's not as easy as they expected.
50. Jessica & the Secret Star: Child star Maria moves to Sweet Valley and Jess discovers her secret.
51. Elizabeth the Impossible: Elizabeth takes things a bit too far when trying to prove herself in a competition for best student.
52. Booster Boycott: Winston wants to join the Boosters.
53. The Slime That Ate Sweet Valley: Jess gets the lead role in her homeroom film and has to kiss Winston Egbert.
54. The Big Party Weekend: The twins and Steven throw a party while their parents are out of town, and it gets out of hand.
55. Brooke & her Rock-Star Mom: Brooke's mom returns and she's the pop sensation "Coco."
56. The Wakefields Strike it Rich: Jess, Liz and Steven each receive $100 from their aunt.
57. Big Brother's In Love: The twins try to set their love-sick brother up with his friend Cathy, but he's in love with Jill Hale.
58. Elizabeth & the Orphans: Melissa and Andy's mother dies and they try to make it on their own.
59. Barnyard Battle: The twins and their class go on a weekend trip to a pioneer farm.
60. Ciao, Sweet Valley: The twins have an exchange student come to live with them.
61. Jessica the Nerd: Jess gets accepted into SOAR!-a program for gifted science and math students.
62. Sarah's Dad and Sophia's Mom: Sarah Thomas and Sophia Rizzo's parents are in love but they hate each other!
63. Poor Lila!: Lila thinks she has lost all her money.
64. The Charm School Mystery: Elizabeth, Amy and Maria try to catch a thief.
65. Patty's Last Dance: Patty Gilbert is diagnosed with scoliosis.
66. The Great Boyfriend Switch: The Valentine's Day Dance doesn't go as planned.
67. Jessica the Thief: Jessica is framed when someone begins stealing things at school.
68. The Middle School Gets Married: The middle school students have to "get married" for a project, but they don't get to pick their partners.
69. Won't Someone Help Anna?: Anna, the first deaf character in the series, arrives in Sweet Valley.
70. Psychic Sisters: Jessica lies to Randy, whose uncle is a filmmaker, that she and Elizabeth are psychic, and they have to prove themselves at the school talent show.
71. Jessica Saves the Trees: Jessica tries to stop construction of the new soccer field when she believes the trees that will be cut down for it are very old.
72. The Love Potion: The Unicorns create a fake love potion for their booth at a school fair.
73. Lila's Music Video: The Unicorns make a music video. Lila is singing; however, it is secretly the voice of Johanna Porter.
74. Elizabeth the Hero: Elizabeth saves Denny Jacobsen from drowning but hates the attention lavished on her afterward.
75. Jessica and the Earthquake: A small earthquake hits Sweet Valley, and Jessica wakes up for it, but exaggerates her experience and claims she can predict earthquakes.
76. Yours for a Day: The middle school has a fundraiser by having people pay to promise to be "master" or "servant" to one another.
77. Todd Runs Away: Todd decides to run away due to the pressures of school and his father.
78. Steven the Zombie: Jessica learns about voodoo and decides to make a voodoo doll of her brother to get back at him.
79. Jessica's Blind Date: Jessica meets a boy through the personal ads in The Sixers.
80. The Gossip War: Three-way calling lands the twins and their friends in trouble.
81. Robbery at the Mall: Elizabeth plays detective to solve a series of crimes in the Valley Mall.
82. Steven's Enemy: The new boy in Steven's class seems to outdo him in everything... and Steven can't stand him for that. Then he has the nerve to try to date Jessica!
83. Amy's Secret Sister: Amy discovers she has a secret half-sister who is a year older, from her father's first marriage, when she comes to visit. She has to come to terms with that and feels insignificant compared to her popular, older sister.
84. Romeo and 2 Juliets: Elizabeth and Jessica fight for the part of Juliet in thea school play.
85. Elizabeth the Seventh-Grader: Elizabeth is skipped up to seventh grade.
86. It Can't Happen Here: A new teacher comes to Sweet Valley and teaches the kids a "game" based on the Holocaust.
87. The Mother-Daughter Switch: Elizabeth and Jessica swap places with their mother Alice, each party thinking the other has the easier life.
88. Steven Gets Even: After the twins and their friend land in a prank war with the boys at school at Halloween, the girls test their scare tactics on Steven. He decides to get even with the ultimate prank.
89. Jessica's Cookie Disaster: Jessica's bakes the best cookies ever and everyone loves them. She's even going to appear on a cooking show! However, she can't remember the secret ingredient.
90. The Cousin War: The twins' cousin Robin visits and is convinced Todd is the one for her, only he's dating Elizabeth!
91. Deadly Voyage: The twins and friends are on a field trip on a boat... but the adults get left behind and the boat is being navigated by two crooks who robbed a bank!
92. Escape from Terror Island: The twins and their friends end up on an island after the boat sinks. They think they have escaped the hijackers... or have they?
93. The Incredible Madame Jessica: Jessica thinks she can read fortunes and tell the future... with bad results.
94. Don't Talk to Brian: Classmate Brian Boyd is a troublemaker. However, when it is revealed that his parents abuse and beat him, many of the kids and parents blame Brian for it.
95. The Battle of the Cheerleaders: The girls start their own basketball team. The boys' team belittle them, so the girls decide to stop cheering at the boys' games.
96. Elizabeth the Spy: The twins witness a robbery.
97. Too Scared to Sleep: When the twins and friends start babysitting a new family in town, supernatural things happen.
98. The Beast Is Watching You: The events of Too Scared To Sleep continue, as the kids the twins and friends sit for have very realistic dreams about a disfigured girl, and awake injured.
99. The Beast Must Die: The strange dreams and apparent supernatural events continue.
100. If I Die Before I Wake (Magna Ed. #4): The twins and friends battle Eva Sullivan, the horrible "dream monster."
101. Twins in Love: The twins meet a set of boy twins they like... however, is each twin with the right mate? Who's who?
102. The Mysterious Dr. Q: After renowned hypnotist Dr. Q visits school, Jessica tries hypnotism, with bad results.
103. Elizabeth Solves It All: Elizabeth becomes exhausted while trying to run the new advice column in The Sixers.
104. Big Brother's In Love Again: Jill Hale wants to go out with Steven.
105. Jessica's Lucky Millions: Steven and Jess find a treasure map and decide to follow it.
106. Breakfast of Enemies: Jessica and Elizabeth try out for the new Corny-O's commercial.
107. Twins Hit Hollywood: The twins are asked to try out for a movie.
108. Cammi's Crush: Cammi and Randy are both competing for top student. However, two harsh substitute teachers who give bad grades stand in their way. While trying to hook the teachers up, the two realize they like each other as well.
109. Don't Go In the Basement: When the principal, Mr. Clark, has to go out of town, he asks the twins and their friends to house-sit. While there, they find unusual things that cause them to believe Mr. Clark has murdered his wife.
110. Pumpkin Fever: It's almost Halloween, and the school is entered in a contest for most-spirited holiday school. Elizabeth makes some earrings from acorns and Jessica passes them off as her own in an attempt to be voted the Halloween queen.
111. Sisters at War: A family get-together at Thanksgiving brings the Wakefields and family together, but no one seems to be able to get along.
112. If Looks Could Kill: The twins argue over a boy.
113. The Boyfriend Game: Elizabeth is chosen to be on a dating show instead of Jessica.
114. The Boyfriend Mess: Everyone gets stuck with the wrong partner at the dance of the decade.
115. Happy Mother's Day, Lila: Lila can't reach her estranged mother in France to participate in the mother-daughter fashion show, so she convinces someone from the women's shelter to fill in.
116. Jessica Takes Charge: When the kids at school are assigned to do volunteer work for the city, Jessica gets stuck in the health trailer.
117. Down With Queen Janet!: 8th grade graduation is approaching, and Janet is being a terror to everyone.
118. No Escape!: The kids go on a field trip to tour caves. When a guide is injured, they realized they are trapped and must rely on themselves to escape!

=== Super Editions ===
1. The Class Trip: There's a sixth-grade trip to an amusement park, but the twins aren't speaking.
2. Holiday Mischief: The twins' friend fakes her way into the choir to visit an embassy in Washington D.C. to visit her birth sibling.
3. The Big Camp Secret: Grace surprises the twins by showing up at camp after her parents forbid her to go. What the twins don't know is that she ran away from home.
4. The Unicorns Go Hawaiian: Jess wins a trip to Hawaii and takes the Unicorns, where they meet with many misunderstandings and mishaps.
5. Lila's Secret Valentine: Rather than be humiliated by admitting her crush doesn't like her, Lila makes up a new boyfriend.
6. The Twins Take Paris: The twins go to Paris for spring break and mistakenly believe their host mother is a murderer.
7. Jessica's Animal Instincts: Taking care of animals is easy! That's what Elizabeth and Jessica and their friends think when they volunteer at the Sweet Valley Zoo, until Elizabeth accidentally lets a mischievous monkey named Spanky out of his cage and he begins showing up in the strangest places.
8. Jessica's First Kiss: Sweet Valley Middle School is going camping! Elizabeth can't wait to swim in the lake, sleep in a tent, and roast marshmallows over a campfire. Best of all, the wilderness provides the perfect setting for a little romance with her sort-of boyfriend, Todd Wilkins. Romance is also in the air for Jessica. She has her eye on Dennis Asher, a cute seventh-grader who is new at school. But Jessica can't survive without a blow-dryer — how can she impress Dennis when she looks so terrible?
9. The Twins go to College: The twins go to a summer program at SVU.
10. The Year Without Christmas: Similar to the movie Groundhog Day, Jessica keeps repeating Christmas over and over until she is completely honest and realizes the Christmas spirit.
11. Jessica's No Angel: Jessica can't stop lying!
12. Good-Bye Middle School: The twins find out they may be moving as they are set to leave middle school and enter junior high.
13. Elizabeth: Next Stop Jr. High: The twins leave middle school and enter junior high.
14. Jessica: Next Stop Jr. High: The twins leave middle school and enter junior high.

=== Super Chillers ===
These books were a series which saw the twins encountering supernatural things such as ghosts and curses.

1. The Christmas Ghost: Jessica and Elizabeth are looking forward to the most glorious Christmas ever. The tree is trimmed, the presents are wrapped, and movie star Beau Dillon is coming to town! The actor, who will be in Sweet Valley to publicize his new movie, has agreed to help Elizabeth raise money for the children's wing of the local hospital. But when the teen star arrives at the Wakefields' house, it's Jessica, not Elizabeth, he meets.
2. The Ghost in the Graveyard: Strange things have been happening to Sam Sloane ever since he moved from San Francisco to the Wakefields' neighborhood in Sweet Valley. He can't figure out why everything in town looks so familiar — or why he's mysteriously drawn to a crumbling old mansion in town. When he visits a cemetery in the dead of night and sees a ghost who looks just like him, he turns to Elizabeth and Jessica for help.
3. The Carnival Ghost: Elizabeth befriends an orphaned girl who travels with a carnival. But as the friendship progresses, Jessica notices that her twin is behaving strangely. After Jessica hears about a ghost which is haunting the carnival, she investigates. Could Elizabeth's new friend be a ghost?
4. The Ghost in the Bell Tower: Determined to use their aunt's eerie old mansion to scare their sister, Elizabeth, into believing in ghosts, Jessica and Steven Wakefield soon become frightened themselves when unexplained events begin to occur.
5. The Curse of the Ruby Necklace: Jessica and Elizabeth are thrilled when they land small parts in a movie being made in Sweet Valley. The film is based on the true story of the mysterious death of twelve-year-old Lillian Keller, and it's being filmed at the creepy old Keller mansion.
6. The Curse of the Golden Heart: While taking a scuba-diving course, Elizabeth and Jessica stumble upon the wreck of an old pirate ship and half of a golden heart, but their delight soon turns to terror when they begin to receive ominous chain letters.
7. The Haunted Burial Ground: Fixing up a run-down shack for their Halloween party, the Unicorn Club is horrified when Ellen finds a skull, Jessica gets lost in a bat cave, and a mysterious ghost girl appears with a warning for them all.
8. The Secret of the Magic Pen: On a hike through a dark, eerie cave, Elizabeth finds something incredible — a glowing pen! She can't wait to use it to write an article for the camp newspaper. But as she writes, she is astonished to find herself composing a mystery full of scary twists and turns. And to her horror, little by little the mystery seems to be coming true! This isn't just an ordinary pen. Could it be haunted?
9. Evil Elizabeth: Everyone thinks of Elizabeth Wakefield as the nice twin. That's why she loves her Halloween mask; it's so scary that no one can believe Elizabeth is behind it. But her appearance isn't the only thing that changes when she puts on the mask.

=== Magna Editions ===
1. The Magic Christmas: After their grandparents give them a pair of matching antique dolls for Christmas, Jessica and Elizabeth are thrown into the most magical adventure of their lives. Along the way they learn what being twins — and best friends — really means.
2. A Christmas Without Elizabeth: When the entire school thinks she has stolen the money raised for the Christmas party — money she has secretly given to a homeless family — Elizabeth wishes she has never been born, and a friendly Christmas angel shows her what life would be like if that were so.
3. BIG For Christmas: The twins wish they were grownups when they are invited to the biggest Christmas party ever and their parents won't let them go, but a shocking transformation has occurred when they wake up the next morning.

=== The Unicorn Club ===
This series traces the members of the Unicorn Club in the Wakefields' seventh grade. Each book is from the point of view of a different Unicorn. In this series, after Kimberly Haver, a snobby Unicorn, moves to Atlanta (and later moves back) and Janet Howell, the former president, leaves for high school, the Unicorn club changes. Elizabeth, Maria, and a sixth grader named Evie become Unicorns too, and they all volunteer at the day care center. When Kimberly moves back, things change, and Elizabeth, Maria, Evie and Mary leave the Unicorns and start a new club called the Angels.

1. Save the Unicorns!: The kids are finally in seventh grade. Jessica Wakefield and Lila Fowler start a dare war to decide who should be the next president of the Unicorns.
2. Maria's Movie Comeback: The Unicorns are working at a day care center to buy a new hairpiece for their principal and thus save the club. They almost give up when the roof of the center collapses, but Maria is offered a movie role that will pay for the hairpiece and the center.
3. The Best Friend Game: The Unicorns go on the Best Friends show.
4. Lila's Little Sister: When a little girl from the day care center with an attachment to Lila decides to run away, she shows up at the Fowlers'. Lila is in turmoil as she tries to figure out what to do.
5. Unicorns in Love: The Unicorns temporarily disband when some members want to spend too much time with their boyfriends during the production of the school play.
6. The Unicorns at War (Super Edition): Kimberly and Mary run against each other for student council president.
7. Too Close for Comfort: The Unicorns are quarantined at the Fowler mansion with German measles, and the Angels are stuck at the Wakefields with the same affliction.
8. Kimberly Rides Again: When members of the Unicorn Club begin hanging out with the goody-goody Angels, a disgusted Kimberley Haver organizes a trip to a dude ranch in order to promote exclusivity among her friends.
9. Ellen's Family Secret: Ellen tries to hide her parents' divorce from the Unicorns.
10. Mandy in the Middle: Mandy is unsure whether she would rather be an Angel or a Unicorn, and both clubs fight for her affection.
11. Angels Keep Out: The Unicorns and the Angels each plan a party for the same night.
12. Five Girls and a Baby: When Ellen's divorced neighbor's baby-sitter asks her to babysit for a few hours, she sees no problem... until she discovers the baby-sitter has eloped and left the country, leaving a baby to be cared for by the Unicorns!
13. Who Will Be Miss Unicorn?: The Unicorns enter a beauty pageant.
14. Lila on the Loose: Lila tries to get attention from her frequently traveling father.
15. Too Cool for the Unicorns: Kimberly Haver must choose between the Unicorns and the Eight Times Eights, a club made up of her fellow eighth-graders.
16. Bon Voyage, Unicorns!: The Unicorns go on a cruise.
17. Boyfriends for Everyone: Each of the girls sets Ellen up with a different guy and tries to mold her to each particular one.
18. Rachel's in, Lila's out: Lila's father puts Fowler Crest on the market, and the potential buyer has a bratty daughter, Rachel. Lila fears that her father is going broke while Rachel spends time at Fowler Crest, tormenting Lila.
19. The Most Beautiful Girl in the World: The Unicorns join a health spa that has a famous teenage model as their celebrity spokesperson. Mandy thinks the model does not seem happy.
20. In love with Mandy: Mandy falls in love with a boy who thinks she is someone else.
21. Snow Bunnies: Ellen Riteman has really been looking forward to the Unicorn Club's ski trip, but trouble with Rachel threatens her fun.
22. Jessica's Dream Date: Jessica is disappointed to find her favorite rock star isn't what he seems.
23. Trapped in the Mall: The Unicorns find themselves locked in the mall after it closes, and both fun and havoc ensue.

=== Team Sweet Valley ===
This short series lasted for two books and follows the Wakefield twins in their team sport endeavours. The first book was published in July 1996 with the "Team Sweet Valley" logo, but was republished in November 1996 as "a special Team Sweet Valley edition" that was part of Sweet Valley Twins.

1. Jessica Goes for Gold: Jessica is to take part in the California Games. It is the chance of a lifetime and Jessica intends to make the most of her place on the school's gymnastic team. Unfortunately, Dawn Maven, the star of the rival team, also wants to win and she will do anything, including sabotage, to be victorious.
2. Win One For Sandra: Elizabeth Wakefield and her teammates on the Sweet Valley Middle School beach volleyball team are headed for the California Games! The team has everything it takes to be champions: fast volleys, killer serves, and most importantly a great coach, Sandra Kimbali. The girls are determined to meet Sandra's high expectations. They're spending every extra minute perfecting their awesome spikes and blocks. However, maybe they're a little too determined: the harder everyone tries to impress Sandra, the worse they play as a team. Just when the girls think it can't get any worse, it does. The baby Sandra's been expecting arrives two months early, and she's forced to take some time off. The girls vow they'll show Sandra that her hard work and dedication weren't wasted. But can they stop blaming one another and put aside their differences to win their most crucial game?

== Graphic novels ==
In 2022, it was announced that the series would be adapted into graphic novels by Nicole Andelfinger and Claudia Aguirre, with the first book Sweet Valley Twins: Best Friends being published by Random House Graphic on November 1, 2022.
