= Sweet Valley Junior High =

Book series

- Author: Francine Pascal
- Country: United States
- Language: English
- Genre: Young adult fiction and romance novel
- Publisher: Random House
- Published: 1999-2001
- Media type: Print (hardcover and paperback); Audiobook

Sweet Valley Junior High is a fictional young adult book series written by Francine Pascal. The first book of the series, Get Real, was published on February 1, 1999. The final entry in the series, Too Many Good-byes, was published on June 12, 2001.

== Plot ==
The story occurs when Jessica and Elizabeth Wakefield's middle school have been rezoned to Sweet Valley Jr. High for 8th grade. Elizabeth adjusts quickly to the new school and becomes popular among her peers. She becomes close friends with Anna Wang and Salvador del Valle, and the three are actively involved with producing the school's alternative zine. Anna and Salvador are long-time best friends, though their relationship is complicated by Salvador's growing feelings for Elizabeth. Elizabeth's friends also include her locker mate Brian Rainey and Blue Spicolli, who later becomes Elizabeth's boyfriend.

Jessica does not adapt to Sweet Valley Junior High as quickly as Elizabeth, especially as she struggles to establish some semblance of the popularity she enjoyed in middle school. She soon becomes frenemies with popular girl Lacey Frells, who antagonizes Jessica. Lacey's best friend, Kristin Seltzer, is considerably friendlier and more welcoming to Jessica. Jessica also joins the track team and becomes close friends with the team's star, Bethel McCoy, and finds a love interest in Damon Ross, a ninth grader.

== Characters ==
- Elizabeth Wakefield: Although initially unhappy with being forced to attend a new school, Elizabeth quickly adjusts and finds new friends, particularly with Anna Wang and Salvador del Valle. She becomes a member of the school paper, The Spectator. She later dates Blue Spicolli, though her relationship with Blue and her friendship with Anna become complicated with growing feelings between Elizabeth and Salvador.
- Jessica Wakefield: Despite Jessica's expectations, she is dismayed to find that her popularity in middle school does not translate to junior high. Her attempts to drive away her geeky but helpful locker mate Ronald Rheese and inability to become friends with the popular Lacey Frells eventually result in Jessica taking a different path, where she joins the track team. Jessica becomes friends with Bethel McCoy, her teammate on the track team, and Kristin Seltzer.
- Anna Wang: One of Elizabeth's classmates who becomes her friend at junior high, Anna is interested in poetry and later joins the drama club. She and Salvador have been best-friends since childhood. Her older brother Tim died in a car accident only a few years earlier and she still grieves his death.
- Salvador del Valle: One of Elizabeth's classmates, who tends to joke around a lot. Salvador quickly develops feelings for Elizabeth, though he does not act on them due to possibly straining his friendship with Anna and seeming lack of interest from Elizabeth. He lives with his grandmother, as his parents are frequently away working.
- Kristin Seltzer: One of the popular girls at school, Kristin is friendly and welcoming. She becomes the student council president, but finds the responsibility often leaves her invisible when she struggles with the pressure.
- Lacey Frells: One of the most popular girls at school, Lacey is Kristin's best friend but is snobby and antagonistic towards Jessica. She lives with her father and stepmother, whom she does not get along with, and hides her disappointment when her successful mother shows little genuine interest in Lacey.
- Bethel McCoy: The star of the track team, who initially thinks Jessica is superficial. When Jessica shows how far she will push herself to be a real member of the track team, she earns Bethel's respect and they become friends. She has no interest in romantic relationships, preferring to focus on being an athlete.
- Brian Rainey: Elizabeth's locker mate and a member of The Spectator with Elizabeth, Anna, and Salvador. He has a long-standing mutual crush on Kristin, who is his childhood friend, but neither of them believes the other's feelings are reciprocated.
- Damon Ross: Jessica's boyfriend, a ninth-grader.
- Ronald Rheece: Jessica's geek locker partner, who is kind to her despite Jessica's desperation to find cooler friends. He makes a brief cameo appearance in Sweet Valley Senior Year.
- Lila Fowler: Jessica's best friend, who still attends Sweet Valley Middle School. As Jessica's interests have changed since attending junior high, she and Lila begin to drift apart. However, Jessica still feels compelled to prove to Lila that she maintains the same popularity she had in middle school.
- Blue Spicolli: An easy-going boy who enjoys surfing and has little interest in school. He winds up becoming Elizabeth's boyfriend.
- Larissa Harris: A British girl with a wild personality who becomes friends with Anna when she joins the drama club. Because she focuses on performing well in her drama class, she has fallen behind in the rest of her classes with little care. She has a crush on Toby.
- Toby Martin (Toby Meeker when introduced): A member of the drama club, who takes an interest in Anna and later becomes her boyfriend.

== List of books ==
#	Title	Author	Publisher	Date
0	Elizabeth: Next Stop, Jr. High	Francine Pascal, Jamie Suzanne	Random House	October 13, 1998
The summer before she starts eighth grade, Elizabeth goes to Costa Rica to work hard and help people but finds a non-stop party instead. When she meets J.P., she thinks he's a jerk at first, but soon finds she might be falling in love with him.
0	Jessica: Next Stop, Jr. High	Francine Pascal, Jamie Suzanne	Random House	November 10, 1998
Jessica and her friends in the Unicorn Club are spending the summer in Hawaii before she starts eighth grade. She's expecting fun on the beach and meeting cute boys, but is confused that her friends seem to be acting strange and isn't sure if they've changed or if she has.
1	Get Real	Francine Pascal, Jamie Suzanne	Random House	February 1, 1999
Elizabeth and Jessica have totally opposite impressions of their first days and new friends at junior high school. Despite expecting to be miserable, Elizabeth is thrilled to make cool new friends, while Jessica is disappointed that she isn't able to join the cool crowd and her only companion is her dorky locker partner.
2	One 2 Many	Francine Pascal, Jamie Suzanne	Random House	February 9, 1999
Jessica doesn't want to admit she's lonely and having trouble adjusting to being at a new school, leaving Elizabeth baffled when her twin suddenly wants to hang out together all the time.
3	Soulmates	Francine Pascal, Jamie Suzanne	Random House	March 9, 1999
From the minute she saw her, Bethel is convinced Jessica Wakefield will not last on the junior high track team, but finds herself pleasantly surprised.
4	The Cool Crowd	Francine Pascal, Jamie Suzanne	Random House	April 13, 1999
When the twins' parents are out of town, Jessica decides it's the perfect time to throw a party for old friends from middle school and new friends and classmates in junior high, despite Elizabeth's protests.
5	Boy. Friend.	Francine Pascal, Jamie Suzanne	Random House	May 11, 1999
Kristin and Brian have liked each other forever, but neither are aware of the other's feelings and think they just want to be friends. When the wrestling team decides to play a cruel prank on girls they think are ugly, Brian tries to find a way to save Kristin from an embarrassing situation.
6	Lacey's Crush	Francine Pascal, Jamie Suzanne	Random House	June 8, 1999
When Lacey's high school boyfriend dumps her, she decides to get a new boyfriend to get back at him. She sets her sights on Damon Ross, despite the fact he's interested in Jessica Wakefield, and makes plans to get Jessica out of the way.
7	How to Ruin a Friendship	Francine Pascal, Jamie Suzanne	Random House	July 13, 1999
After Elizabeth and Salvador share a kiss, they struggle with keeping it a secret in hopes of saving their friendship with Anna, who is having a hard time as the anniversary of her brother's death approaches.
8	Cheating on Anna	Francine Pascal, Jamie Suzanne	Random House	August 10, 1999
Salvador has a crush on Elizabeth, but he's been dating his best friend Anna. He doesn't want to break her heart, but Anna is going to discover that Salvador and Elizabeth have been seeing other.
9	Too Popular	Francine Pascal, Jamie Suzanne	Random House	September 9, 1999
Jessica has been trying to get attention from super cute Damon Ross, but her disappointment is only noticed by her geeky locker mate, Ronald Rheece. When the whole school thinks Ronald is her boyfriend, Jessica realizes that she has even bigger problems to handle.
10	Twin Switch	Francine Pascal, Jamie Suzanne	Random House	October 12, 1999
Jessica gets her superperfect, ultrasweet twin sister, Elizabeth, to help her out of a jam, but the old "trading places" trick gets the twins in some interesting situations and Elizabeth is wondering why can't Jessica solve her own problems for once.
11	Got a Problem?	Francine Pascal, Jamie Suzanne	Random House	November 9, 1999
Lacey's family life is not going smoothly so she start being rude to her friends. Even though her best friends think they're helping, Lacey just wants to be left alone to sort out the problems she has because, despite everyone's good intentions, they don't have all the answers.
12	Third Wheel	Francine Pascal, Jamie Suzanne	Random House	December 1, 1999
Bethel is annoyed because everyone at school seems to be part of a couple. It makes her sick and she's glad she'll never be that way.
13	Three Days, Two Nights	Francine Pascal, Jamie Suzanne	Random House	January 11, 2000
Selected for a school trip to Sacramento to compete in an academic tournament, Salvador sees an opportunity for socializing with his friends.
14	My Perfect Guy	Francine Pascal, Jamie Suzanne	Random House	February 8, 2000
Now that she's dating Damon, Jessica is confused with his behavior. When they were friends, he was sweet to her, but now he practically forgets her name.
15	Hands Off	Francine Pascal, Jamie Suzanne	Random House	March 7, 2000
Elizabeth senses a plot. After all, Jessica has barely talked to Salvador before, and now she calls him all the time to discuss Elizabeth's love life. Elizabeth wishes her jealous friends would give up, because she really likes the guy.
16	Keepin' it Real	Francine Pascal, Jamie Suzanne	Random House	April 11, 2000
Anna decides breaks out of her close circle of friends and to try something completely different by joining the drama club.
17	Whatever	Francine Pascal, Jamie Suzanne	Random House	May 9, 2000
Lacey, who lives with her father and stepmother, faces a visit from her biological mother, a successful fashion photographer. She's certain that her mother cares about her, even though they've never really talked or spent any time together. Meanwhile, Kristin and Bethel compete over who is in charge of planning the eighth-grade carnival.
18	True Blue	Francine Pascal, Jamie Suzanne	Random House	June 13, 2000
His friends all think that Blue has the coolest lifestyle - he lives with his older brother in a house by the beach - but they have no idea that his life is not as great as it seems. He begins to take an interest in school, especially now that he's met Elizabeth Wakefield.
19	She Loves me...Not	Francine Pascal, Jamie Suzanne	Random House	July 11, 2000
English teacher Mrs. Serson starts a journal writing project, where Damon confides that he's jealous of his mother's new boyfriend and doesn't want to tell Jessica because he doesn't want her to think he's whining. Jessica worries that being paired up with Chris Grassi, the most popular boy in school, for a science project will spoil her relationship with Damon and that her boyfriend likes Mrs. Serson. Meanwhile, Lacey breaks up with her high school boyfriend Gel and she finds herself falling for Richard Griggs.
20	Wild Child	Francine Pascal, Jamie Suzanne	Random House	August 8, 2000
Larissa hopes to land a starring part in the school musical, but doesn't get the part she wants. When she neglects her studies to concentrate on having fun, she discovers that failing grades will prevent her from participating in the play.
21	I'm So Outta Here.	Francine Pascal, Jamie Suzanne	Random House	September 12, 2000
Jessica becomes jealous when Elizabeth starts hanging out with her friends more frequently, so she tries to teach her sister a lesson.
22	What You Don't Know	Francine Pascal, Jamie Suzanne	Random House	October 10, 2000
Anna discovers that Larissa has a crush on Toby, so she hides her own feelings for him to help Larissa and Toby get together. Meanwhile, class president Kristin must cope with changes when her favorite teacher and student government advisor, Ms. Kern, leaves the group.
23	Invisible Me.	Francine Pascal, Jamie Suzanne	Random House	November 14, 2000
Everyone thinks that Kristin's perfect, but as class president, she questions herself when the student government likes Bethel's idea more than her own. Meanwhile, Blue teaches Brian how to surf, in spite of his friends' teasing.
24	Clueless	Francine Pascal, Jamie Suzanne	Random House	December 12, 2000
Everyone says it's impossible to just be friends with a guy, but Elizabeth is sure that's all that she and Blue are. Even when lets her use his special surfboard and calls her all the time, she's hoping that they'll stay friends...
25	Drama Queen	Francine Pascal, Jamie Suzanne	Random House	January 9, 2001
Anna thought her relationship with Toby was perfect, but they've been arguing non-stop since they starting working together on a play. She's not sure if she should break up with him, even though she still really likes him.
26	No More Mr. Nice Guy	Francine Pascal, Jamie Suzanne	Random House	February 13, 2001
When Kristin tries to be assertive, she creates more problems than she solves. Brian thinks everyone is ignoring him, including Kristin, and decides it's time to stand up for himself.
27	She's Back	Francine Pascal, Jamie Suzanne	Random House	March 13, 2001
Jessica is proud to be friends with Lila and thrilled when they start hanging out again. But when as Jessica makes more and more sacrifices for her old friend's sake, she begins to wonder if it's worth it.
28	Dance Fever	Francine Pascal, Jamie Suzanne	Random House	April 10, 2001
Elizabeth accepts Ronald Rheece's invitation to the school dance, but she's dismayed that Blue's date is gorgeous and super cool. Blue isn't her boyfriend, but she still feels jealous.
29	He's the One	Francine Pascal, Jamie Suzanne	Random House	May 8, 2001
Elizabeth has boyfriend troubles. If that weren't enough, what happens when horrible news invades the twins' lives?
30	Too Many Good-Byes	Francine Pascal, Jamie Suzanne	Random House	June 12, 2001
As summer vacation begins, Elizabeth and Jessica are unhappy to learn their family is moving to Utah. The twins must find a way to say goodbye to their friends and how to deal with a move that neither of them wants.
