= Sweet Valley High =

Series of novels attributed to Francine Pascal

- Author: Francine Pascal
- Country: United States
- Language: English
- Genre: Young adult fiction; romance; mystery; thriller
- Publisher: Random House
- Published: 1983–2003
- Media type: Print (hardback & paperback); Audiobook; E-book

Sweet Valley High is a series of young adult novels attributed to American author Francine Pascal, who presided over a team of ghostwriters to produce the series. The books chronicle the lives of identical twins Jessica and Elizabeth Wakefield, who live in the fictional Sweet Valley, California, a suburb near Los Angeles. The twins and their friends attend Sweet Valley High. The series ran from the 1980s until the early 2000s and sold more than 200 million copies.

The series began in 1983, and concluded twenty years later after the publication of 181 books. The books are generally classified as young adult or children's fiction and belong mostly to the genre of soap opera, romance novel or fantasy-adventure. The series quickly gained popularity and spawned several spin-off series, including Sweet Valley Senior Year and Sweet Valley University, as well as a television adaptation. In July 2017, a film adaptation was also announced.

The novels Sweet Valley Confidential and The Sweet Life, which follow the characters as adults, were published in 2011 and 2012.

== Characters ==
- Elizabeth Wakefield and Jessica Wakefield are identical twin sisters and the main characters of the series. Elizabeth is sensible and down to earth, being practical and known to be a good listener. Jessica is outgoing and wilder, cares more about fashion and appearances, and is somewhat more devious. Jessica is the typical Valley girl. Both girls are popular with their peers in their own ways.
- Ned and Alice Wakefield are the parents of a son, Steven, and identical twin daughters, Elizabeth and Jessica. Lawyer Ned Wakefield met interior designer Alice Robertson while they were at college and flower-child Alice was engaged to conservative Hank Patman. After meeting Ned, Alice realized that she didn't love Hank and broke off their engagement; she wed Ned soon after. They were said to have been married for 20 years at the start of the series, so would have married in 1963. Ned is a general-practice lawyer and the head of a prominent Sweet Valley firm. Alice works as an interior designer at one of the town's major design firms. Although they are quite comfortable, they do not consider themselves wealthy.
- Steven Wakefield, the twins' older brother, is tall and dark-haired like his father Ned. Although he loves both sisters equally, he's partial to Elizabeth. He teases Jessica, but understands her more than any other member of their family. In the beginning of the series, he dates Tricia Martin, whose family didn't have the best reputation. After Tricia dies of leukaemia, he dates Cara Walker. They plan to marry until she decides to move to London. During the university books, Steven moves in with Billie. He ends up marrying Cara after college.
- Todd Wilkins, Elizabeth's on/off boyfriend, is tall, popular, handsome, a captain of the basketball team (as well as the wide-receiver of the football team in the 2008 reboot) and a fraternity member. He has dark-brown hair and eyes. Todd is initially romantically pursued by both Elizabeth and Jessica, but he and Elizabeth date. He is a scholar and an athlete. Like Elizabeth, he is a polymath. While Elizabeth and Jessica look alike, Elizabeth and Todd have almost identical personalities as well as interests. Todd and Liz break up when Todd's family moves to Vermont and Todd eventually becomes romantically involved with the terminally ill Suzanne. He also shares Liz's passion for creative writing and eventually gets a job writing a professional sports column for several newspapers. On Todd's return to Sweet Valley, he and Elizabeth reunite. They repeatedly cheat on one another as well as break up and reunite. But Todd eventually ends up with Jessica. Elizabeth only finds out after she finds them having an affair during her and Todd's engagement. Todd and Jessica eventually wind up getting married and have a son, Jake.
- Enid Rollins is Elizabeth's best friend when they meet in a creative-writing class pre-series, until they grow apart in senior year. Enid is described as pretty, with curly brown hair and big green eyes. As a young teenager, Enid was a problem user of drugs and alcohol until she was involved in a bad accident; she has since reformed and become a model student: quiet, sweet, and straitlaced. She is a member of the Pi Beta sorority, but joined only to lend Elizabeth moral support. In college, Enid reinvents herself and begins to use her middle name, Alexandra. She immediately joins an elite sorority and enters into a high-profile romance with big-shot college basketball player Mark Gathers. Life in the fast lane proves too much for Enid/Alex and she eventually suffers a re-occurrence of her substance abuse. She also has an affair with Todd Wilkins, even falling for him and becoming dependent on him when Mark abandons her. She does patch things up with Elizabeth, but never again are they close friends. In Sweet Valley Confidential, she becomes extremely self-centered and arrogant, becomes a well-respected OB/GYN, and has plans to run for City Council. She never marries.
- Maria Slater In late-series, Maria shares the title of Elizabeth's best friend with Enid. She is a beautiful former child actress and star reporter for the Oracle. Senior year sees her friendship with Elizabeth unravel as Liz makes new friends from the school merger but they eventually mend their relationship. Maria holds the distinction of class valedictorian, snatching it out from under both Liz Wakefield and Winston Egbert, who were each considered a shoo-in for the honor.
- Lila Fowler, Jessica's best friend and arch-rival. She and Bruce Patman are bitter rivals, as her family (her father George owns a computer company) wants to modernize Sweet Valley, while Bruce's family wants to maintain the history of the town, from when canning was the main industry. One of the wealthiest people in town, Lila is a "poor little rich girl" archetype. The Fowlers and the Wakefields are close friends and even Elizabeth, who usually doesn't move in the wealthier circles, is often friendly towards Lila. At first Lila is very snobbish and devious, but an attempted rape by John Pfeifer, plus her parents' remarriage, helped make her more sympathetic. In Sweet Valley Confidential, she is married to Ken Matthews and they're expecting.
- Winston Egbert, the class clown, had a major crush on Jessica, mainly during the first few books. He dates a girl named Mandy Farmer, who later moves away, and then begins dating Maria Santelli, a popular cheerleader. In college, he starts going by the name of "Winnie" and a clerical error leads to his placement in an all women's dorm, where he meets popular sorority girl Denise Waters, arguably the love of his life. Unfortunately, life after university sees Winston transform from a goofy, cheerful oddball into a mean, resentful businessman whose wealth from the dotcom boom can't cure his loneliness. Later he meets Edith and she changes his ways. they later marry.
- Nora Dalton is a French teacher who once dated Lila's father, George Fowler. Later a romance bloomed between her and English teacher Roger Collins.
- Roger Collins is an English teacher who serves as adviser to the school newspaper, The Oracle, and is one of Elizabeth's favorite teachers.
- Mr. Cooper, Sweet Valley's somewhat stuffy principal, nicknamed Chrome Dome because of his bald head.
- Bob Russo, The sternest teacher at SVH, he teaches chemistry.
- Bruce Patman is a rich, handsome snob. Considered to be a rival of the equally nouveau-riche Fowler family, as he and his old-money family want to preserve the town as it was when canning was the main industry. He is an avid tennis-player and race-car driver. Known for his trademark black Porsche with a license plate that read 1BRUCE1. While Elizabeth and Jessica only look alike, Jessica and Bruce actually are alike—personality-wise. He is as shallow, self-absorbed and materialistic as she is. He once dated Jessica, which ended badly (as he cheated on her) and made them bitter rivals. Later he dated Regina Morrow, who helped him become a bit more sincere, but after her untimely death he fell back into his arrogant routine. Later he dated Pamela Robertson. Despite his arrogance, family means much to him and he becomes very caring toward his orphaned cousin Roger (once he gets used to this formerly-poor nobody actually being his own blood). His parents' deaths softened him and made him more sincere, and according to Sweet Valley Confidential, this leads to an eventual romance with his one true love, Elizabeth Wakefield. But just as Elizabeth seems like she's found the love of her life, he confesses he's in love with Annie Whitman.
- Olivia Davidson is the arts editor of the Oracle and one of Elizabeth's best friends. She dies in the earthquake that hit Sweet Valley.
- Nicholas and Regina Morrow, wealthy but down-to-earth siblings and close friends of Elizabeth. Elizabeth did not normally move in the wealthier circles of Sweet Valley, but the Morrows' down-to-earth nature won her over. Regina was deaf, but had radical surgery to restore her hearing; she dated Bruce seriously and helped change his personality for the better. Regina got in with the wrong crowd following her breakup with Bruce and experimented with drugs; she died after snorting a small amount of cocaine, which aggravated a rare heart condition. Nicholas once had romantic feelings toward Liz, but nothing came of it as she had a steady boyfriend, and they chose to remain friends. Liz helped Nicholas cope when his sister died.
- Amy Sutton, Elizabeth's best friend in the Sweet Valley Twins books and then Jessica's good friend in Sweet Valley High. Amy returns in the Sweet Valley High books as a completely different character. Whilst she once shared interests with Elizabeth, such as working on the school newspaper, she returned much more like Jessica, a boy-crazy gossip. Later, she mellows and becomes enamored of Barry Rork.
- Jeffrey French is Elizabeth's "preppy" ex-boyfriend, the handsome blond star of Sweet Valley High's soccer team who disappeared from the series following their breakup. They begin a serious relationship after Todd moves to Vermont, but break up shortly after Todd's return.
- Cara Walker is Jessica's close friend. Early in the series she was a notorious snob and gossip, but her parents' split (in which she was separated from her brother) made her more mature and attracted Elizabeth's warm concern. She dated Steven Wakefield for a time and almost ran away to get married so they wouldn't be separated when her family moved to London, but they realized it wasn't practical. Years later they are reunited married, though unhappily. Cara bakes constantly, eating to hide her feelings of hurt at Steven's rejection as rumors of his cheating run rampant in Sweet Valley - and worse when the truth is revealed that he's actually involved with another man, former SVH soccer star Aaron Dallas.
- Ken Matthews is a star quarterback and dater of several Sweet Valley ladies during the course of the series. In the first few books, he is called "Kenny" by his friends and teachers, though that nickname soon disappears. He is Jessica's steady boyfriend for part of junior year, and also secretly dates Elizabeth after Todd moves away. In Sweet Valley Confidential, he is a famous football player, husband of Lila Fowler, and - as he learns at the end of the sixth book - a father-to-be.
- AJ Morgan is Jessica's first serious boyfriend. Jessica is instantly smitten with the redhead when he moves to Sweet Valley and becomes shy and demure when he is around, acting more like Elizabeth. Eventually she relaxes enough around him to be herself, and finds that he much prefers her fun-loving, outgoing personality.
- Sam Woodruff is Jessica's second long-term steady boyfriend and a dirt-bike rider. Sam is killed in a car accident while riding as Elizabeth's passenger after Jessica spikes their drinks with alcohol. Jessica later felt guilty for inadvertently causing his death, but couldn't confess to her wrongdoing knowing her family will be angry at her.

=== Other characters ===
- Chris Sanders is a handsome new guy and Elizabeth's crush.
- Jeannie West is a cheerleader and a friend of the twins. She is best friends with Sandra Bacon.
- Sandra Bacon is a cheerleader who got the spot because of her friendship with Jeannie, despite her poor performance. She and Jeannie were best friends.
- Caroline Pearce is the twins' neighbor. At first she was a catty gossip, but she changed for the better with help from Elizabeth. She has an older sister named Anita.
- Manuel Lopez is Sandra Bacon's boyfriend.
- Sally Larson is a cousin of Dana Larson. Sally comes to live with Dana's family after growing up in foster homes.
- Susan Stewart is a friend of the twins. She is later discovered to be the daughter of a famous film director.
- Lois Waller is the chubby daughter of the school dietitian, and later marries Aaron Dallas.
- Heather Sanford is Aaron Dallas' girlfriend, a dress designer who becomes Elizabeth's friend.
- Julie Porter was Elizabeth's friend in sixth grade and in junior year. She is a talented musician.
- Johanna Porter is Julie's older sister, also Elizabeth's friend; Elizabeth tutors her in English and she later discovers that math and science are favorite and strong subjects.
- Peter DeHaven is one of the smartest boys in Sweet Valley High.
- Abbie Richardson is a cartoonist for The Oracle (she draws the strip "Jenny"), and a former friend of Jessica and Lila. She later becomes Elizabeth's friend.
- John Pfeifer is a former sports editor for The Oracle, Jennifer's ex-boyfriend, and Lila's would-be rapist/tormentor. He is the one who plagiarized Elizabeth's writing to try to get revenge for refusing to date him.
- Tricia Martin is Steven's ex-girlfriend and Betsy's sister. She died of leukemia, like their mother.
- Betsy Martin is Tricia's older sister who was a drug addict, Elizabeth's friend, and Jessica's nemesis.
- Aaron Dallas is a popular soccer player who dated Jessica throughout middle school, and is a close friend of Liz's ex-boyfriend, Jeffrey French. He and Lois waller marry.
- Courtney Thomas is a character in the non-continuity Super Edition Perfect Summer. Courtney is the daughter of a friend of Bruce Patman's family.
- Rene Glize is Elizabeth's friend from Cannes, France. He wears "unmistakably" tight French jeans. At first hostile towards her and Jessica, due to their shared American heritage, he and Liz eventually become good friends; during her harrowing adventures in London he is her closest friend and comforter. He first appeared in the non-canonical book Spring Break, along with his mother Avery and his sister Ferney, but became part of canon whilst Liz and Jess were in London.
- George Warren is Enid's, then Robin's, boyfriend. Robin and George fell in love while taking pilot classes together.
- Christian Gorman is Jessica's late boyfriend. He died in a gang-related fight between SVH and Palisades High.
- Ronnie Edwards is Enid's ex-boyfriend. He had gambling problems.
- Tom McKay is a handsome tennis player at SVH.
- Barry Rork is Amy's boyfriend who volunteers at the teen helpline. Best friends with Tom McKay and was one of the first people Tom M confided in about being gay, aside from Elizabeth.
- Justin Belson, is a boy who used to go out with Molly Hecht. He and Regina became friends, incurring Molly's jealousy and indirectly had a hand in her death.
- Molly Hecht is a reformed drug addict who used to be part of a bad crowd. She hosted the party at which Regina Morrow died from doing cocaine. Her best friend was Jan Brown, who had a boyfriend named Jay Benson; and she also knew a college-aged drug dealer, Buzz Jackson, who supplied the deadly cocaine.
- Claire Middleton is SVH's first female quarterback.
- Pamela Robertson is Bruce's beautiful girlfriend from a rival school. She comes to SVH to escape her bad reputation.
- Heather Mallone is Jessica's beautiful blonde rival who tries to steal the cheerleading squad out from under Jessica; she eventually becomes her co-captain and the girls are forced to tolerate each other.
- Devon Whitelaw is a wealthy boy from Westwood, Connecticut who falls for Elizabeth while she's still seeing Todd.
- Conner McDermott is Elizabeth's senior-year love interest who has a brief romance with Maria Slater as well.
- Bill Chase is a blond surfer who briefly dated Jessica because she reminded him of his late girlfriend Julianne. After he realizes Jessica was using him, he finds true love with DeeDee Gordon.
- DeeDee Gordon is Bill's artistic girlfriend.
- Rick Andover is the often drunk bad boy who took Jessica to a roadhouse, where she passed herself off as Elizabeth.
- Kirk Anderson Obnoxious senior. Plays tennis. He went on a few dates with the twins' visiting cousin Kelly.
- Penny Ayala is the editor of the SVH school newspaper, The Oracle. She wants to be an editor of an international newspaper, and is one of Elizabeth's best friends.
- Maria Santelli is a politically savvy cheerleader, daughter of Sweet Valley's mayor, and Winston's girlfriend.
- Roger Barrett Patman is the cousin of arrogant Bruce Patman. Initially very poor and working as a janitor to help support his mother, Roger was adopted into the Patman family when his mother died and he was revealed to be the illegitimate child of Bruce's deceased uncle. He is more friendly and sincere than his cousin, but loyal to him.
- Annie Whitman is a sophomore whom Jessica wouldn't consider for the cheerleading squad because of her bad reputation, but after attempting suicide she was allowed to join. In Senior Year, she is one of the only people aside Jade who became close friends with Jessica and side with her during the Jessica/Melissa feud.
- Robin Wilson is co-captain of the cheerleading squad with Jessica until she moves away. At first very obese, she was cruelly hazed by the Pi Beta Alpha sorority, most notably Jessica, Cara, and Lila. Elizabeth befriended her and tried her hardest to help her fit in. After being blackballed she lost weight, snatched the homecoming queen title from Jessica, and instantly became popular. Jessica and Robin still see each other for who they are. She maintains her friendship with Elizabeth as she was the only one who saw more to her than her former obese self. Robin eventually steals Enid's boyfriend George Warren and later develops an eating disorder. She is stopped by Elizabeth and her concerned aunt who convinced her to seek help.
- The Droids is Sweet Valley High's resident band: Dana Larson (vocals), Guy Chesney (keyboards), Emily Mayer (drums), Max Dellon (lead guitar) and Dan Scott (bass guitar).

== Spin-off series ==
=== Sweet Valley Kids ===
The twins are seven-year-old second graders at Sweet Valley Elementary School in this series, which included several Special Editions and "Super Snooper" mystery books.

The books are:

1. Surprise! Surprise!
2. Runaway Hamster
3. The Twins' Mystery Teacher
4. Elizabeth's Valentine
5. Jessica's Cat Trick
6. Lila's Secret
7. Jessica's Big Mistake
8. Jessica's Zoo Adventure
9. Elizabeth's Super Selling Lemonade
10. The Twins and the Wild West
11. Crybaby Lois
12. Trick or Treat
13. Starring Winston Egbert
14. Jessica The Baby-Sitter
15. Fearless Elizabeth
16. Jessica the TV Star
17. Caroline's Mystery Dolls
18. Bossy Steven
19. Jessica and the Jumbo Fish
20. The Twins go to the Hospital
21. Jessica and the Spelling Bee Surprise
22. Sweet Valley Slumber Party
23. Lila's Haunted House Party
24. Cousin Kelly's Family Secret
25. Left-Out Elizabeth
26. Jessica's Snobby Club
27. The Sweet Valley Cleanup Team
28. Elizabeth Meets Her Hero
29. Andy and the Alien
30. Jessica's Unburied Treasure
31. Elizabeth and Jessica Run Away
32. Left Back!
33. Caroline's Halloween Spell
34. The Best Thanksgiving Ever
35. Elizabeth's Broken Arm
36. Elizabeth's Video Fever
37. The Big Race
38. Good-Bye Eva?
39. Ellen is Home Alone
40. Robin in the Middle
41. The Missing Tea Set
42. Jessica's Monster Nightmare
43. Jessica Gets Spooked
44. The Twins Big Pow-Wow
45. Elizabeth's Piano Lessons
46. Get the Teacher!
47. Elizabeth the Tattletale
48. Lila's April Fool
49. Jessica's Mermaid
50. Steven's Twin
51. Lois and the Sleepover
52. Julie The Karate Kid
53. The Magic Puppets
54. Star of the Parade
55. The Jessica and Elizabeth Show
56. Jessica Plays Cupid
57. No Girls Allowed
58. Lila's Birthday Bash
59. Jessica + Jessica = Trouble
60. The Amazing Jessica
61. Scaredy Cat Elizabeth
62. The Halloween War
63. Lila's Christmas Angel
64. Elizabeth's Horseback Adventure
65. Steven's Big Crush
66. And the Winner is... Jessica Wakefield!
67. The Secret of Fantasy Forest
68. A Roller Coaster for the Twins!
69. Class Picture Day!
70. Good-Bye Mrs. Otis
71. Jessica's Secret Friend
72. The Macaroni Mess
73. The Witch in the Pumpkin Patch
74. Sweet Valley Blizzard
75. Little Drummer Girls
76. Danger: Twins at Work

Super Snooper Editions:

1. The Case of the Secret Santa
2. The Case of the Magic Christmas Bell
3. The Case of the Haunted Camp
4. The Case of the Christmas Thief
5. The Case of the Hidden Treasure
6. The Case of the Million-Dollar Diamonds
7. The Case of the Alien Princess

Super Special Editions:

1. Trapped in Toyland
2. Easter Bunny Battle
3. A Curse on Elizabeth (Hair Raiser Super Special Edition)
4. Save the Turkey!
5. Elizabeth Hatches an Egg

=== Sweet Valley Twins ===
The Sweet Valley Twins series features the twins as sixth grade students attending Sweet Valley Middle School. Though the series focuses primarily on Elizabeth and Jessica, it also features stories of their friends and classmates. Some relationships from Sweet Valley High have changed, such as Amy Sutton being a good friend to Elizabeth rather than Jessica, as they are in high school. The series was succeeded by The Unicorn Club and Sweet Valley Jr. High.

=== The Unicorn Club ===
The Unicorn Club is a spin-off of Sweet Valley Twins, featuring the Unicorn Club introduced in the Twins series. The series takes place when the twins are seventh graders, still at Sweet Valley Middle School. This series focused on the club members in general, not specifically the twins.

1. Save the Unicorns - The Unicorns are ultimately forced to disband, thanks to a dare war designed to elect their new president. In the end, the ban is lifted, and Elizabeth Wakefield and Maria Slater join the club. (narrated by Mandy Miller)
2. Maria's Movie Comeback - Maria is looking to audition for a role in a new movie, but shortly afterwards, she begins to lose confidence in herself and her acting abilities. Near the end, a sixth-grader named Evie Kim joins the club. (narrated by Maria Slater)
3. The Best Friend Game - The Unicorns face the Eight Times Eights on the Best Friends game show, with disastrous results. (narrated by Elizabeth Wakefield)
4. Lila's Little Sister - Lila must convince a young girl named Ellie to return home, after Ellie thinks her mother is ignoring her. (narrated by Lila Fowler)
5. Unicorns in Love - Four of the Unicorns have found new love, resulting in the ultimate test of their friendship. (narrated by Evie Kim)
6. The Unicorns at War (Super Edition) - Kimberly Haver returns and competes against Mary Wallace for Student-Council President, resulting in half the club renouncing the Unicorns and founding a new club called the Angels. (narrated by Mary Wallace)
7. Too Close for Comfort - The Unicorns and the Angels are quarantined for German measles. (narrated alternatively by Jessica and Elizabeth Wakefield)
8. Kimberly Rides Again - Kimberly takes the remaining Unicorns to a dude ranch, where they end up fighting over a cute stable boy. (narrated by Kimberly Haver)
9. Ellen's Family Secret - Ellen's parents are getting a divorce, and she tries to convince them not to. (narrated by Ellen Riteman)
10. Mandy in the Middle - Mandy Miller finds herself torn in two when she starts hanging out with both the Unicorns and the Angels. She ultimately rejoins the Unicorns after hearing Lila had spent time with a boy Mandy was mentoring. (narrated alternatively by Lila Fowler and Mandy Miller)
11. Angels Keep Out - The Unicorns and the Angels hold separate parties on the same night, but must eventually make a compromise. (Narrated alternatively by Jessica and Elizabeth Wakefield)
12. Five Girls and a Baby - Ellen and the other Unicorns are stuck baby-sitting for a family friend while she is out of town. (Narrated by Ellen Riteman)
13. Who will be Miss Unicorn - The Unicorns enter a beauty pageant being held in Sweet Valley, but only one of them can go home with the crown. (narrated by Mandy Miller)
14. Lila on the Loose - Feeling neglected by her father, Lila tries everything she can to get him to pay attention to her. (narrated by Lila Fowler)
15. Too Cool for the Unicorns - With Amanda Harmon leaving Sweet Valley, the Eight Times Eights must elect a new member and ask Kimberly Haver to join. (narrated by Kimberly Haver)
16. Bon Voyage, Unicorns - In a two-part story, the Unicorns go on a cruise, but Ellen feels that there is no room in her life for romance, until the Unicorns each fix her up with a boy that they think she'll like—only to find out that the boy each of them picked seems perfect for each of them. (Note: From this book to the last in the series, the story is not told by a specific book character.)
17. Boyfriends for Everyone - The Unicorns finally end their vacation with the boy each of them likes, while Ellen finally finds her soulmate in a boy named Curtis Bowman.
18. Rachel's in, Lila's Out - Lila's dad is selling Fowler Mansion to the family of a girl named Rachel Grant, but Lila plans on evicting the potential buyers. Rachel and Lila eventually accept each other as friends, and Rachel joins the Unicorn Club.
19. The Most Beautiful Girl in the World - The Unicorns meet Katherine Pierce, a model and spokeswoman for a local health spa, only to find that their idol is not all that she appears to be.
20. In Love with Mandy - In a "Cinderella"-esque story, Mandy Miller falls in love with a rich boy named Brandon Jones, but he thinks he is in love with Lila Fowler.
21. Snow Bunnies - During a vacation to a ski resort, Rachel has a temporary falling-out with the other Unicorns when she tries to come between Ellen and Curtis Bowman.
22. Jessica's Dream Date - Jessica wins a date with her musician idol, Johnny Buck, only to be disappointed by the fact that her musical Hero is really a zero.
23. Trapped in the Mall - The Unicorns are trapped in the mall after closing time, and eventually must get help when Ellen is badly injured. This is the last book in the series.

=== Sweet Valley Junior High ===
This series occurs when the twins are eighth graders. Elizabeth and Jessica are rezoned to Sweet Valley Junior High, where a number of new characters are introduced. Elizabeth adjusts quickly to the new school and becomes popular among her peers. Jessica does not adapt to Sweet Valley Junior High as quickly as Elizabeth, especially as she struggles to establish some semblance of the popularity she enjoyed in middle school.

=== Sweet Valley High: Senior Year ===
Following the conclusion of the original Sweet Valley High series, the twins' final year of high school was depicted in SVH: Senior Year. After the devastating earthquake that claimed the lives of their friends and destroyed their homes, the damage to the El Carro High forces a redistribution of its students to local high schools in Sweet Valley and Big Mesa. Elizabeth and Jessica find their senior year to be as emotionally tumultuous as the last as new relationships are formed, old ones are changed, and they must look forward to life after high school.

=== Sweet Valley University ===
After graduating from Sweet Valley High, Jessica and Elizabeth attend Sweet Valley University, where they begin a new chapter of their lives.

=== Elizabeth ===
Chronologically this is the final chapter in the series and the only spin-off that did not feature Jessica directly. It continues from the plot that occurred at the end of Sweet Valley University; Elizabeth flees to London, intending to continue her schooling. The series has six books.

==== List of novels ====
#	Title	Author	Publisher	Date
1	University Interrupted	Francine Pascal	Random House	January 9, 2001
Elizabeth Wakefield is not going back to Sweet Valley University. Her sister betrayed her. Her boyfriend broke her heart. And her parents are against her. There's nothing for her to go home to. So where is she supposed to go? How about London... as far away as possible?
2	London Calling	Francine Pascal	Random House	February 13, 2001
Elizabeth has no money and no friends, and is still in London. She takes a job as a maid in an earl's manor.
3	A Royal Pain	Francine Pascal	Random House	March 13, 2001
He's engaged to someone else. Elizabeth is falling in love. With Max. Heir to the earl's fortune. Fiancé to a duchess. They're completely different. But there's something there.
4	Downstairs, Upstairs	Francine Pascal	Random House	April 10, 2001
She's in trouble. Big trouble. Liz could get deported. Unless someone from Pennington mansion stands up for her. But who? Everyone hates her. Especially Sarah, her boss's daughter, who'd love to see her sent back to America. However, Max believes in Liz's innocence and exposes Sarah's bad deeds after a lengthy investigation. Humiliated, Sarah confesses to setting Liz up because Max wouldn't love her back. Liz's name is restored and Sarah is arrested for her scam.
5	Max's Choice	Francine Pascal	Random House	May 8, 2001
Max finally chooses between Liz and the duchess.
6	I Need You	Francine Pascal	Random House	June 12, 2001
Jessica heads to London, telling Elizabeth to come home and she can explain everything. But when Liz refuses claiming what she did is very irresponsible of her and unforgivable, Max convinces Jessica to explain herself here because he know she deserves to know the truth. When she finally does, will Elizabeth forgive her?

=== Sweet Valley Confidential ===
Sweet Valley Confidential was published on March 29, 2011. The story was entirely written by creator Francine Pascal, and is set 10 years following the conclusion of the previous novel. Prior to the novel's release, Pascal stated, "I can tell you that what you thought was going to happen to those people doesn't happen. Different things happen. Ten years, from 16 to adulthood, has made very different people. And I'm having kind of a good time writing it, doing what I want to do with these people." Most reviews by professional critics were negative. One review from Entertainment Weekly stated, "Make no mistake: This is a very bad book, bloated and silly and, worst of all, often quite boring."

Fans of the series have given mixed-to-negative reviews, citing many inconsistencies and canonical errors. For example, near the beginning of the book, Elizabeth's ex-boyfriend Jeffrey French is mentioned as being happily married, while in the last "epilogue" chapter, he is "still unmarried and unattached." There are many other mistakes in the epilogue as well, such as what happened to Suzanne Devlin: "Suzanne was forced to leave Sweet Valley but returned 6 months later a changed person; unfortunately, she was ill with multiple sclerosis. She apologized to everyone, then crashed her specially equipped car after taking medication with champagne." Suzanne Devlin was mistakenly diagnosed with MS in the SVH magna edition Perfect Christmas, but then finds out that she was misdiagnosed, and she and Todd fall in love. In describing what became of Roger Collins, Pascal states that after having been accused of molestation by Suzanne Devlin (book 11, "Too Good to be True"), he "felt too uncomfortable being a teacher and left to become a nonfiction writer." SVHC also says his son's name is "Sam," not "Teddy," as in all the SVH books. Another inconsistency is the way Jessica talks in the book, peppering her sentences with "So," and "like," which is a departure from the way she spoke in the SVH and SVU series.

==== Plot ====
The story begins with Elizabeth in New York, where she is working on a magazine called Show Survey, described as "a sort of Zagat for Off Broadway." Through flashbacks, we learn that Jessica and Todd had been having an affair off and on for the last five years, and that eight months ago Elizabeth discovered their duplicity, and has not spoken to either of them since. A few characters from the original series pop up, most notably Winston Egbert, who invested in a dot-com venture with Bruce Patman (also a major character in this book, Bruce's personality changed dramatically when both of his parents died, making him a more caring, sensitive person). Time, unrequited love and other negative life experiences have turned Winston into a bitter hateful Scrooge-like miser who womanizes and shows contempt for himself and all humanity. He no longer has any friends. He dies midway through the book from an "accidental" drunken fall from his 20-story balcony. Jessica and Todd still live together in Sweet Valley. Jessica has a very successful career for a cosmetics marketing company called "MYFACEISGREEN" and Todd is a successful sports columnist. They are very much in love, but haunted by what they have done to Elizabeth and by the vicious gossip that surrounds them.

The twins are expected to attend their grandmother's eightieth birthday party. Elizabeth is torn, not wanting to see her sister and Todd again, but wanting revenge for what Jessica has done to her. She goes to the party, bringing Liam, a handsome bartender she has met in New York in order to have him flirt with Jessica and get her revenge for the affair. However, it proves to be a failure as he instead flirts with her older brother, Steven (who also comes out as gay). Liz's actions ends up causing a rift between Jessica and Todd, which escalates into a free-for-all between all the members of the family. Alice Wakefield, the twins' mother, desperately tries to keep the peace, repeatedly asking the staff to serve the cake, finally losing her cool and screaming to her husband, "Ned! Bring out the fucking cake!" After the party, Ned and Alice reprimands Elizabeth for her behavior. They blame her for not only ruining her grandmother, Marjorie's birthday party, but also Jessica and Todd's relationship. Fed up with her family for defending Jessica and not understanding where she's coming from, Liz prepares to leave for New York. Before she could leave, Bruce sympathetically talks to Elizabeth and convinces her to take a long hard look at herself by using their old friend, Winston, as an example.

Later that night, lying in bed, Jessica realizes that in order to get her sister back, she has to give up Todd. She packs a bag and heads to New York to see her sister. Meanwhile, Elizabeth has been doing some serious thinking on the plane at Bruce's admonition. She finally comes to the realization that she and Todd weren't going to make it work a long time ago, but was too much of a "commitment control freak" to admit it to herself. Elizabeth finds Jessica on her doorstep to apologize for what happened. At first, she didn't want to forgive her, but remembering Bruce's wise words, she relents and the sisters hold each other, sobbing, and make up. Elizabeth apologizes to Jessica in ruining her relationship with Todd and convinces her that Bruce had talked to her. She accepted that she and Todd were long over, but was an extreme control commitment freak to admit it. She gives Jessica her blessing to be with him. The epilogue takes place at Jessica and Todd's wedding, which many of the characters attend. Bruce professes his love for Elizabeth, and the two of them presumably live happily ever after.

=== Sweet Valley: The Sweet Life ===
The new series features six confirmed books and takes place a few years after 2011's Sweet Valley Confidential. Elizabeth, Jessica and Todd are now thirty. Jess and Todd have a son as well. And the two have an affair and nearly divorce after their trial separation. They then get back together after they declare their love for one another. At the end of book six, Elizabeth is hoping that Bruce will propose, but instead he confesses to being in love with an old flame he dated in high school. Also in the books it develops the relationship between the twins' brother Steven and his partner Aaron as the two get married and have a baby girl.

== TV series ==
A TV series based on Sweet Valley High ran for 88 episodes in a total of four seasons between 1994 and 1997. It starred real-life twins Brittany and Cynthia Daniel (formerly Doublemint twin models) as Jessica and Elizabeth respectively. The twins also modeled for later editions of the book covers.

There were notable differences between the television series and the books. New characters were created, such as Reginald "Shred" Patman and Renata Vargas, while other characters were removed, such as Ned, Alice, and Steven Wakefield. Also, while the books are classified in the romance or fantasy/adventure genres, the television series was played out in a more humorous fashion.

Only Season One of the show was officially released on DVD.

=== Possible reboot TV series ===
In December 2021, it was reported that a new television series adaptation, titled Sweet Valley, was in the works at The CW. The project was announced to be co-produced between CBS Studios, Paramount Television Studios, Chernin Entertainment, and Fake Empire with Josh Schwartz, Stephanie Savage, and Ashley Wigfield as executive producers. As of 2024, the series has not entered production.

== Film adaptation ==
In July 2017, a film adaptation of the novel series began production.

== Merchandising ==
Many tie-in products were produced for this series (primarily the Sweet Valley High run) including a series of puzzles (4), a board game, audio book versions of selected SVH books (6), commercially available VHS (2) and a DVD of the SVH TV Series, a CD soundtrack for the TV show, dolls and doll clothing (6), a neon sign, at least one calendar (for the year 1989/90) and books that were not part of the series (including TV tie-in reprints, a trivia book, a behind-the-scenes book about the TV show, and a "Slam Book").
