= Gilbreath =

Gilbreath is a Scottish surname. It is a variation of the surname Galbraith. Notable people with the surname include:

- Alexandra Gilbreath (born 1969), English actress
- Briana Gilbreath-Butler (born 1990), American basketball player
- Erasmus Corwin Gilbreath (1840–1898), United States Army officer
- Frederick Gilbreath (1888–1980), United States Army officer
- Lucas Gilbreath (born 1996), American baseball player
- Norman Laurence Gilbreath (born 1936), American magician and mathematician
- Rod Gilbreath (born 1952), American baseball player
- Wardell Gilbreath (born 1954), American sprinter
- William C. Gilbreath (1851–1921), American politician

== See also ==
- Gilbreath's conjecture, a conjecture in number theory
- Gilbreath shuffle, a card shuffling method
- Gilbreth
