= 20th Indiana Infantry Regiment =

20th Indiana Volunteer Infantry Regiment
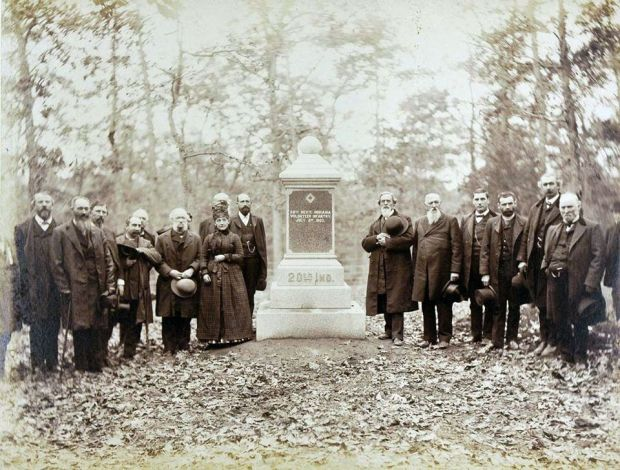
- Surviving members of the 20th Indiana Regt. gather at the Gettysburg Battleground for the dedication of a monument in their honor, 1885.
- Active: July 22, 1861, to July 12, 1865
- Country: United States
- Allegiance: Union
- Branch: Infantry
- Type: Rifle regiment
- Size: Regiment
- Engagements: Battle of Hampton Roads; Peninsular Campaign; Battle of Second Bull Run; Battle of Chantilly; Battle of Chancellorsville; Battle of Fredericksburg; Battle of Gettysburg; Battle of the Wilderness; Battle of Spotsylvania; Battle of Cold Harbor; Siege of Petersburg

The 20th Indiana Volunteer Infantry Regiment was an infantry regiment that served in the Union Army during the American Civil War. The Regiment was officially raised on July 22, 1861, by William L. Brown, the first Colonel of the Regiment, in response to President Lincoln's call for volunteers. At the time of muster, the regiment had 9 fighting companies lettered A-K along with a staff company for a total of 10 companies, roughly 1000 men. The 20th Indiana saw engagements in most of the major battles of the American Civil War, including the action between the first ironclads at Hampton Roads, the Battle of Fredericksburg, the Battle of Gettysburg, and the Siege of Petersburg. The Regiment was part of the 1st Brigade, 3rd Division, III Corps for the duration of the war.

== Service ==
The 20th Indiana Volunteer Infantry was organized at Lafayette, Indiana, on July 22, 1861. The regiment mustered out of service on July 12, 1865. It spent the entirety of its service in the eastern theater of the war.

== Creation of the Regiment ==
William L. Brown, a veteran of the Mexican–American War, was given permission by the United States Secretary of War to raise a volunteer rifle regiment to be mustered into service with the United States Army. Brown went across Indiana talking to friends in order to raise enough companies for the regiment. This was accomplished by various people in various counties over the course of June, 1861. Brown set the date of July 4, 1861, as the date for all companies to rendezvous in Lafayette, Indiana, in order to be properly mustered into service.

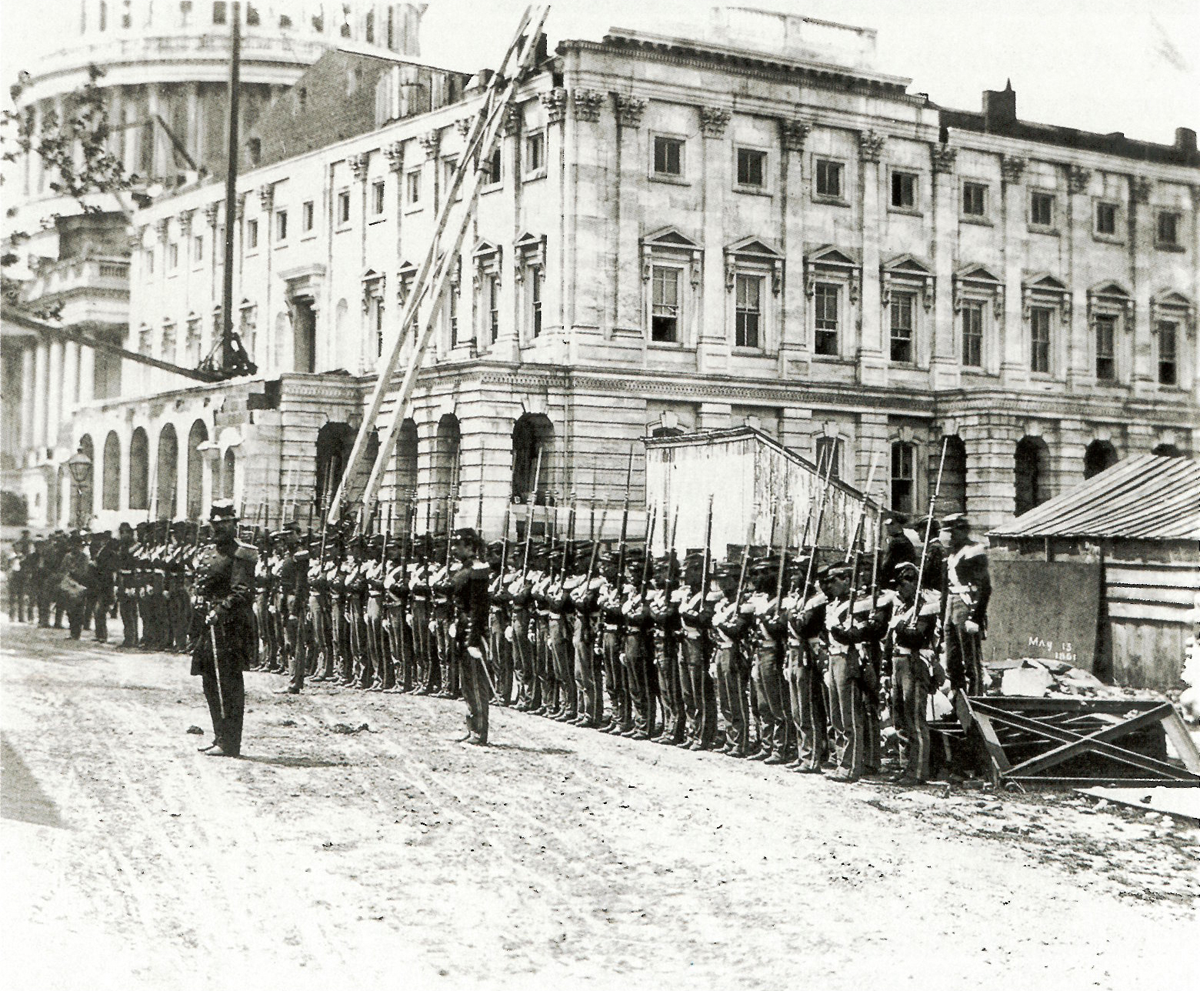
An example of troops being mustered into service during the Civil War. This photo taken in front of the United States Capitol Building.

The Regiment was assembled between July 20–22, with the latter date being when it was officially mustered into service. The mustering process was markedly simple, due to the dire need of fighting men. The process consisted of the various companies being assembled in a large, open field. A mustering officer would walk among the ranks of the companies, looking at the general physical appearance of each man along with his hands. There are at least two documented instances of the mustering officer stopping to question the ability or age of prospective volunteers. The first instance involved a man by the name of Smith who had lost is right index finger in a farm accident. The mustering officer questioned how accurate Smith could be with a weapon, if he could hold a weapon at all with his disability. When the mustering officer asked Smith if he could "hit a man at 400 yards", Smith retorted "I wish you would step out there and let me try". Smith was sworn into the Regiment.

The second occurrence involved a young boy by the name of Boulson who was standing on blocks in an attempt to make his stature look like someone who was of age to fight. The mustering officer quickly dismissed the boy, admonishing him to return to his mother. Boulson indignantly refused, and eventually ended up as a serving boy to one of the officers of I Company, 1st Lt. Erasmus Gilbreath. In this way, Boulson was able to stay with the regiment until he was of age to enlist, becoming a fifer in I Company and eventually Chief of Field Music for the Regiment.

At the time of muster, the Regiment's officers and companies were as follows:

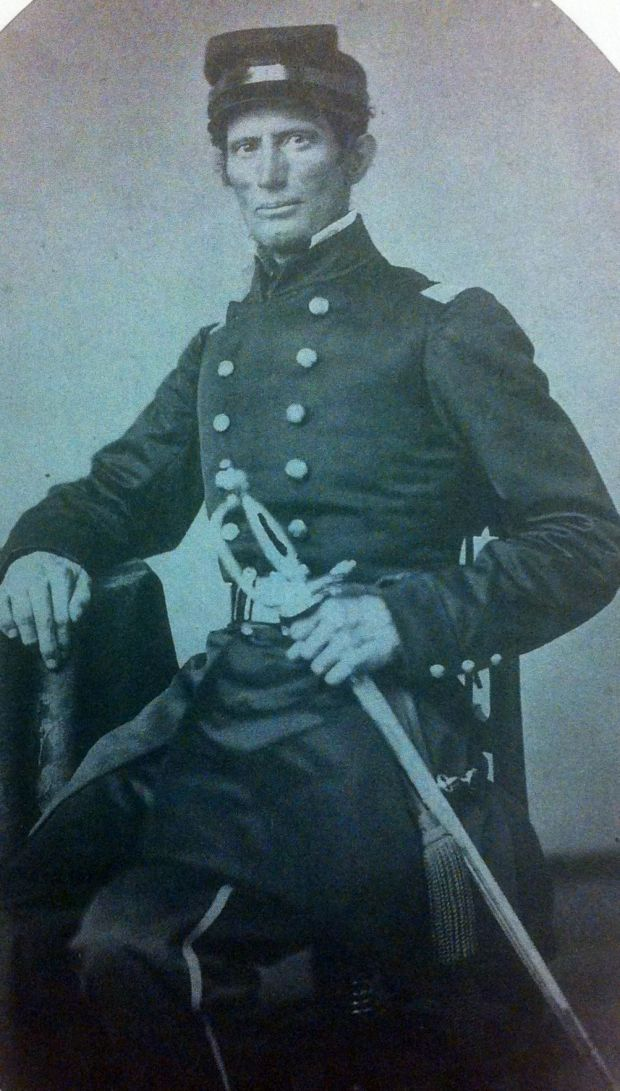
Col. William Brown, creator of the 20th Indiana Volunteer Regiment and first commanding officer of the regiment.

- Field and Staff Company:
  - Col. William L. Brown
  - Lt. Col. Charles D. Murray
  - Maj. Benjamin H. Smith
  - Adjt. Israel N. Stills
  - Reg. Qtr. Isaac W. Hart
  - Ch. William C. Porter
  - Surg. Orpheus Everts
  - Asst. Surg. Anson Hurd
- A Company
  - Cpt. John Van Valkenburg
  - 1st Lt. William B. Rayburn
  - 2nd Lt. John Hoover
- B Company
  - Cpt. John Wheeler
  - 1st Lt. Charles A. Bell
  - 2nd Lt. Michael Sheehan
- C Company
  - Cpt. Oliver H. P. Bailey
  - 1st Lt. William C. Castleman
  - 2nd Lt. Joseph Lynch
- D Company
  - Cpt. George F. Dick
  - 1st Lt. Charles Reese
  - 2nd Lt. James A. Wilson
- E Company
  - Cpt. James H. Shannon
  - 1st Lt. John W. Andrews
  - 2nd Lt. John E. Sweet
- F Company
  - Cpt. John Kistler
  - 1st Lt. John H. Logan
  - 2nd Lt. Edward C. Sutherland
- G Company
  - Cpt. Nathaniel C. Herron
  - 1st Lt. William C. L. Taylor
  - 2nd Lt. William H. Brittingham
- H Company
  - Cpt. George W. Geisendorff
  - 1st Lt. George W. Meikel
  - 2nd Lt. William O. Sherwood
- I Company
  - Cpt. James W. Lytle
  - 1st Lt. Erasmus Corwin Gilbreath
  - 2nd Lt. William I. Carr
- K Company
  - Cpt. Alfred Reed
  - 1st Lt. John I. Richardson
  - 2nd Lt. Daniel D. Dote

The Regiment, at that point totaling roughly 1200 men, left Lafayette on the 25th of July for Indianapolis, where they would be properly equipped with weapons, uniforms, and other standard-issue items. Upon arriving in Indianapolis, the Regiment made camp at Camp Morton. Meanwhile, William Brown, who had been made Colonel of the Regiment, gave the governor and the local quartermaster exact figures for equipping the Regiment.

The officers in the regiment were told to procure their uniforms and weapons on their own, the enlisted men of the regiment received their equipment from the government supply. Standard issue uniforms for enlisted men, according to the journal of Erasmus Gilbreath, consisted of "a jeans suit, gray in color, and the coat or jacket was of Zouave shape with rounded corners and a braided edge". According to Gilbreath, the troops expected to be equipped with the new model 1861 Springfield Rifle. At that point in the war, the government did not have enough rifles to equip both the regular army as well as the newly recruited regiments, leading the government to substitute the more modern rifles with the much older 1855 Springfield Musket, which had been modified to use percussion caps. The regiment was reportedly so disgusted with their equipment that they threw their weapons down in the street in indignation. The Governor attempted to cool the situation by promising the first few companies would have the new model rifles at an expedited time and the rest of the regiment would have them as soon as possible.

From Indianapolis, the Regiment was transferred by train to Baltimore. Along the way, the Regiment busied itself by guarding various bridges along the Baltimore and Ohio Railroad. Upon arriving in Baltimore, Col. Brown ordered the Regiments' weapons to be loaded and on half-cock, essentially indicating a preparedness to fire. This was due to the recent Baltimore riot of 1861, which was led by a group of Confederate sympathizers against the Union troops stationed in the city. Col. Brown, feeling that the populace might still be hostile to Union troops, ordered the regiment to load their weapons. From Baltimore the regiment was sent by steam ship to Fort Monroe, where they were camped until September 26, 1861.

== Deployment to Hatteras Inlet ==
On the 26th of September, the regiment moved from Fort Monroe to Fort Hatteras, recently taken from the Confederates during the Battle of Hatteras Inlet Batteries, on Hatteras Island in preparation for an assault against Confederate troops defending further up the inlet. 500 men in 7 companies were deployed to Chicamicomico Beach, Hatteras Island, on September 29, 1861. Their main objective was to dislodge an enemy force from Roanoke Island. The commanding officer of Fort Hatteras was in such a haste to have this objective accomplished that the men landed at Chicamicomico Beach without supplies or tents. Regimental Quartermaster Isaac W. Hart and a small detail arrived with proper supplies on October 1. However, the gunboat carrying Hart and the supplies was attacked by three Confederate gunboats shortly after Hart began unloading the supplies that afternoon. Hart and 47 men were taken prisoner, and the supplies and equipment were captured by the Confederate gunboats, who had kept the Regiment under suppressing fire to prevent any interference from land.

On the morning of October 4, Gilbreath sighted a Confederate fleet of nine ships steaming towards the current position of the detachment. It was believed that the fleet was carrying a detachment of Confederate soldiers detailed to cut off the regiment from Fort Hatteras, leading Col. Brown to decide to retreat. The Regiment returned to Fort Hatteras on October 5. Due to some good luck, the 20th Indiana was able to make it back to Fort Hatteras without any serious incident, as the Confederate ships carrying the majority of their troops had run aground far from the Regiment's position. It was later found out, after the Regiment had returned to Fort Hatteras, that in comparison to their 500 troops, who were all equipped with smooth-bore muskets and no artillery, the Confederates had sent down over 2000 troops to potentially capture the Union force.

Little occurred following October 5. On November 3, a steamship arrived with the much anticipated shipment of rifles. On November 10, the regiment was ordered back to Fort Monroe.

== Battle of the Ironclads ==
Mural painted by Crown Point artist Marion Kellum depicting the 20th Indiana's service at the Battle of Hampton Roads. The mural adorns a wall at Crown Point's Col. John Wheeler Middle School.

While stationed at Fort Monroe, the 20th Indiana was witness to the Battle of Hampton Roads, also known as the Battle of the Ironclads. During the CSS Virginia's initial successes, during which it sank the USS Cumberland and burned the USS Congress, the 20th Indiana aided wounded sailors who washed up on the beach and provided small arms support for the USS Monitor upon its arrival. General Joseph K. Mansfield, commanding officer of the Coastal Batteries overlooking the battle, is reported to have become so engrossed in the battle that he "...forgot all else. At one shot from the Monitor, he would exclaim 'Damned it you're firing too high!', or to the Merrimac [when it engaged the Monitor] 'You cussed Rebel, you didn't hurt us a bit!'".

== Seven Days Battles ==
In early 1862, General George B. McClellan devised a plan to take Richmond by transporting his forces via steamship to Urbanna, Virginia and outflank the Confederate forces outside Washington. This became known as the Peninsular Campaign. Union forces maneuvered up the James River and disembarked at Harrison's Landing, then marching towards Richmond. The Union forces split at the Chickahominy River, with a smaller force on the southern side of the river. On May 31, Confederate General Joseph E. Johnston, firmly believing the city could not withstand a major siege, counterattacked. The following battle became known as the Battle of Seven Pines (or Battle of Fair Oakes). Although the result was inconclusive, the Confederates unknowingly managed to halt McClellan's march towards Richmond.

Following the Battle of Seven Pines, the regiment was officially transferred to the Army of the Potomac, under General McClellan. The regiment was assigned to the 1st Brigade ("Robinson's Brigade"), of the 3rd Division (Kearney's Division), of the III Corps, commanded by General Samuel P. Heintzelman. Although the commanders of the Brigade, Division, and Corps changed throughout the war, the 20th was never reassigned.

=== Battle of Oak Grove ===
Coming nearly three weeks after the Battle of Seven Pines, the Battle of Oak Grove was McClellan's only offensive movement during the Peninsular Campaign. The action was meant to secure the Union left flank, so that McClellan could bring his siege guns into position just south of Old Tavern. The 20th Indiana was located on the left side of the advancing Union picket line. The regiment began advancing with the rest of the picket line at 8:30 A.M., and encountered mild resistance, with the majority of the fighting taking place on the far right flank of the Union line. McClellan ordered the advance to halt at 1 P.M., fearing that casualties would be too high. Upon surveying the field for himself, he allowed the advance to continue.

During this pause, Confederate troops seized the opportunity to regroup, and at 5:30 P.M., launched a counterattack against the Union left flank, the location of the 20th Indiana. The 87th New York Regiment, which was in the immediate right of the 20th Indiana, broke under heavy pressure from the Confederate charge, just as the 20th was beginning a charge of its own against the confederate positions. This fully exposed the right flank of the 20th Indiana to the Confederate attack. Although the regiment initially fell back in "great confusion". Private Joshua Lewis of the 20th Indiana wrote that upon encountering the deadly flanking fire of the enemy, the men of the regiment broke ranks, and "So it was then, every man for himself...SO I ran as fast as I could, some ran for camp, but...stopped as soon as they were out of immediate danger." The regiment did rally on its colors and re-establish its picket line in roughly the same position it started when the attack began, and in doing so drove off three different Confederate attacks. The 20th Indiana incurred 125 casualties during the Battle of Oak Grove, with 11 dead, 82 wounded, and 32 captured. The 20th Indiana's losses were second only to that of the 1st Louisiana Regiment. Although it was the 20th Indiana's first time in action, it was highly praised for its ruggedness and ability to withstand fire.

=== Battle of Savage's Station ===
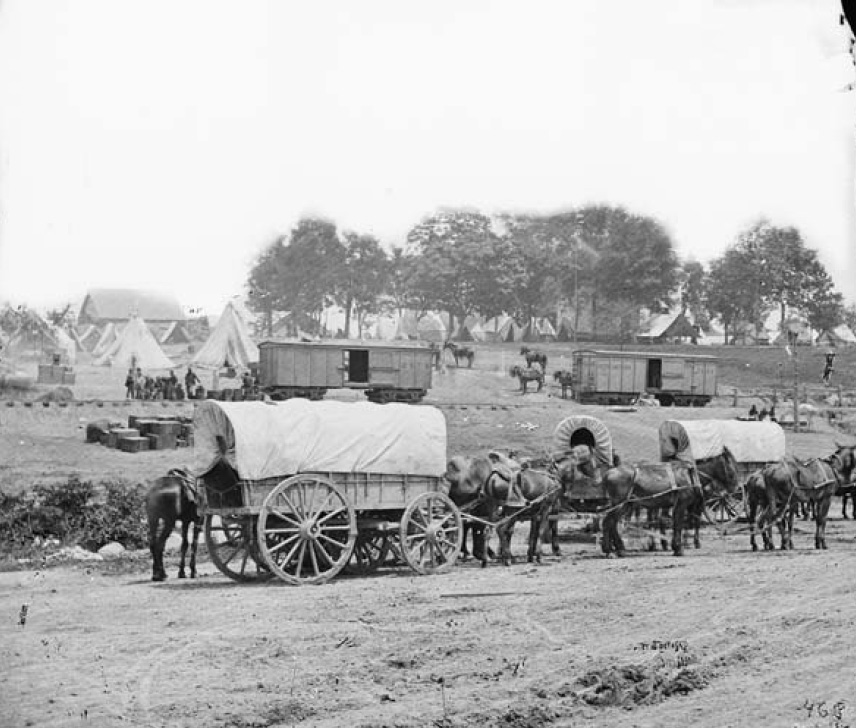
George McClellan's headquarters at Savage's Station

By the 27th of June, believing that he was vastly outnumbered, General McClellan decided to pull his army back to the James River in a tactical retreat. As McClellan did this, General Robert E. Lee formulated a plan to strike at the flank of the Army of the Potomac, potentially destroying it. His plan was, however, hampered by an unusual slowness that plagued Jackson throughout the Seven Days' Battles, as well as "poor staff work, faulty maps, geographical obstacles, timid division commanders (especially Magruder and Benjamin Huger), stout Yankee resistance" all worked to plague Lee's plan.

Between the 28th and 29 June, most of the Union forces had pulled back to Savage's Station, one of McClellan's main supply dumps. The 20th Indiana bore witness to the Battle at Savages station, and was tasked with holding the station during the night until all possible Union forces had been evacuated. The regiment repelled two further Confederate attacks that night, eventually withdrawing with the rest of the Army towards White Oak Swamp.

It is theorized that the main failure of Lee to destroy the Union rear guard at Savage's Station is due to General John Magruder's sluggishness to get his troops into battle, poor staff work at Lee's headquarters, and General Jackson's continuing sluggishness.

=== Battle of Glendale ===
The day after the inconclusive fight at Savage's station, Lee hoped once more to destroy the Union army with a concentric assault from seven divisions near the village of Glendale. Glendale was of vital importance to the Union withdrawal, as it was a major crossroads and rail junction. Without these intersections, the Army's march towards the James River would be cut off. The Confederate assault once more became mired due to Jackson's sluggishness, leaving only General James Longstreet's and General A.P. Hill's divisions to engage the five Union divisions stationed at Glendale.

The 20th Indiana was deployed on the right flank of the Union line, under the immediate command of General Phillip Kearny, with General George A. McCall commanding the Union center and General Joseph Hooker commanding the Union left flank. The attack started at 2:30 P.M., with Longstreet charging McCall's troops and breaking them, capturing McCall in the action. Hooker acted quickly and reversed the Southern breakthrough. Longstreet then turned his attention to the Union right flank, sending troops under command of Generals Pryor, Featherston, and Gregg in such great amounts, it led General Kearny to exclaim "such masses had I never witnessed!" The Confederates charged a total of three times, managing after each unsuccessful charge to regroup and renew the attack. Col. Brown of the 20th Indiana had taken the precaution of establishing a breastwork of rails and timber before the assaults, sparing numerous lives. Private Joshua Lewis of the 20th Indiana wrote that he was certain the other regiments behind the 20th, who did not have breastworks, certainly suffered greater than the 20th. During one charge, Kearny was in danger of losing his artillery batteries. Kearney charged the rebel line with the 63rd Pennsylvania Volunteer Regiment, the 37th New York Volunteer Regiment, and the 20th Indiana, and succeeded in routing the Confederate advance and saving the battery. The battle continued until 9:30 P.M., with near constant firing. Private Lewis wrote that "We fired so rapidly our guns became too hot to hold on to". As light grew dim, it became difficult to distinguish friend from foe, leading one officer of the 20th to advance forward to identify troops he thought to be friendly, only be politely told by a Southern colonel that he was now a prisoner of the Confederate Army. Two companies of the 20th Indiana were deployed to the front, but in the darkness they went beyond their intended positions, prompting a minor Confederate assault on the two companies. This assault cost the 20th Indiana two officers, 1st Lt. Andrew of Company E (Killed) and Capt. Reed of Company K (Captured), along with 34 enlisted men.

During the engagement, Brown reported that the regiment "'Behaved with great coolness', the men engaged in jesting, cracking jokes, and loading and firing deliberately as if [they were shooting at] target".

=== Battle of Malvern Hill ===
Following the failure to destroy the Union army at Glendale, Lee had one last hope to destroy "those people" (his term for the enemy). The Union army had taken up a position three miles south of Glendale on Malvern Hill. This position was 150 ft. high and surrounded by deep ravines, forcing Lee into a frontal assault on the defenders. The Union defenses consisted of four divisions and roughly 100 pieces of artillery, with about the same number in reserve. Lee believed, however, that the Union army was demoralized, and about to break. He came to this assumption based on various pieces of evidence from the past few days of fighting, such as the route of retreat being littered with abandoned equipment (including over 30,000 small arms), the capture of over 6,000 Union stragglers, and the sheer fact that the Army of the Potomac was in retreat.

The Army of the Potomac, however, was not demoralized. 1st Lt. Gilbreath of I Company wrote that his men, although currently retreating from the enemy and having suffered significant losses during the previous battles, remained in high spirits. Disjointed communications led to the Confederate army advancing in small sections rather than all at once, which allowed the Union guns on top of Malvern Hill to pulverized the advancing Confederates.

The 20th Indiana, along with the rest of III Corps, was held in reserve and did not see action during the battle, however the regiment did receive shots from the initial Confederate barrage, leaving 13 dead.

== Second Battle of Bull Run ==
The failure of McClellan's Peninsular Campaign prompted president Lincoln to appoint General John Pope to the newly formed Army of Virginia. Pope's objectives were to protect Washington and the Shenandoah Valley from Confederate raids or invasion, and to keep the Confederate army from attacking the Army of the Potomac by moving towards Gordonsville. Lee, having reorganized his army into two easily controllable groups under Longstreet and Jackson, saw no need to attack McClellan as he no longer saw him as a threat and advanced his groups to Gordonsville to meet Pope. On August 27, 1862, Jackson maneuvered around Pope and sought to destroy the major supply depot at Mannassass Junction. Pope, seeing this as an opportunity to get rid of Jackson, rapidly got his disjointed Corps together during the night of August 28–29 through a series of forced marches, and then hurriedly threw them piecemeal at Jackson in an attempt to break his line. Because of this, Pope was unable to get more than 32,000 men into action against Jackson's 22,000. Even though Union troops broke Confederate lines at points, the Confederates hung on tenaciously and quickly filled the gaps.

Colonel John Wheeler

The 20th Indiana was rushed into the action on the evening of the 27th and arrived early in the morning of the 28th. On the 29th, the Regiment was maneuvered into position opposite an unfinished railroad which served as a sort of breastwork for the Confederate forces. After forming a skirmish line, the regiment advanced roughly two miles to drive the confederates out of their positions. The regiment suffered the majority of their losses in this action, but were successful in temporarily breaking the Confederate line. By 4:00 P.M., the regiment had crossed the railroad and had slowed their advance. While the 20th Indiana had been advancing, the rest of the army had come under significant pressure from Confederate forces, breaking parts of the Union lines. This prompted General Phillip Kearny to order the 20th Indiana to wheel left in order to prevent a potential flank attack. Moving into position, the regiment took cover among the high grass and brush provided by the immediate area.

This maneuver prevented the regiment from being attacked head-on by a group of Confederate soldiers. As the Confederates passed by the regiment, Private Peter Schwartz of Company I suddenly stood up and opened fire on the Confederates. The regiment quickly followed Schwartz's example, completely destroying the extreme left wing of the Confederate advance. Shortly after this success, during a withdrawal ordered by General Kearny, Col William Brown was shot through the temple by a Confederate sharpshooter. Maj. Wheeler assumed command of the regiment.

The regiment spent the night of August 29–30 in the field near the railroad. In the morning they were relieved and relegated to minor support roles during the rest of the battle.

== Battle of Fredericksburg ==
Although General McClellan had routed General Lee's army at the Battle of Antietam, he did not attempt to pursue or destroy it. This irritated President Abraham Lincoln, who was looking to destroy the Confederacy quickly, leading to McClellan's removal as commander of the Army of the Potomac. General Ambrose E. Burnside replaced McClellan, and quickly came up with a strategy to take Richmond. Burnside's plan involved travelling up the Rappahannock river to the town of Fredericksburg, Virginia. While he did this, he would send a sizeable detachment in the opposite direction towards Lee's fortifications at Richmond to keep Lee guessing as to what Burnside was attempting to do. Burnside would then cross the Rappahannock at Fredericksburg, wheel his army left, and then advance towards Richmond behind Lee's fortifications, forcing him into an open battle where the North's superior numbers would inevitably win. Due to bureaucratic delays, delays in the vital pontoons needed to cross the Rappahannock at Fredericksburg, and luck on General Lee's part, Burnside was unable to attack until December 11, long after Lee had moved the majority of his forces from Richmond to the outskirts of Fredericksburg.

Following the death of Col. Brown, Lt. Col. John van Valkenburg was promoted to command, with John Wheeler being promoted to Lt. Col. of the regiment. The Regiment formed part of the Center Grand Division, and was maneuvered to the middle-left flank of Stafford Heights. On Dec. 13, General Meade was instructed to assault the Confederate right flank, positioned around Prospect Hill. Although Meade succeeded in breaking the Confederate line, General Franklin did not send reinforcements to strengthen Meade's position. Meade's troops began to run low on ammunition, prompting Meade to withdraw from Prospect Hill towards his lines. In order to try to relieve the pressure on the Confederate troops, General Jackson ordered General Taliaferro forward to plug the gaps. This coincided with Meade's retreat and resulted in Meade's troops being pursued by Taliaferro's troops towards Union lines.

The 20th Indiana sent into action to stop the Confederate pursuit. Crossing the southern pontoon bridges at double-quick speed, the regiment charged into the Confederate pursuit at approximate 1 P.M., taking 27 casualties. The Brigade the 20th was attached to took a total of 146 casualties. Following the battle, the regiment withdrew to its previous position near the town of Falmouth where they camped throughout the winter. During the Winter, Col. van Valkenburg was mustered out of service for disloyalty. Although many of the men firmly believed he was not disloyal to the cause, it was a well known fact that he was a very ardent admirer of McClellan, and had been indiscreet about his opinions on McClellan's removal from command. He was replaced by Col. John Wheeler.

== Battle of Chancellorsville ==
Following the defeat at Fredericksburg, General Burnside offered President Lincoln his resignation from both the Army of the Potomac and the Army itself. Lincoln persuaded Burnside to stay in the army, transferring him to the western theater. Command of the Army of the Potomac was given to General Joseph "Fighting Joe" Hooker. President Lincoln had since come to a firm decision that the primary objective of the Army of the Potomac was to destroy General Lee's army, rather than to capture a geographic strongpoint, such as Richmond. Hooker constructed a plan which would involve splitting his army in two, with one pincer attacking Lee's front and the other pincer maneuvering around Lee's rear to attack him from behind simultaneously. However, a combination of General Lee's daring and General Hooker's loss of nerve prevented this from happening.

The Regiment arrived at Chancellorsville around 11:00 A.M. on May 1, and was sent into the field around 5:00 P.M. towards Hazel Grove, where the pickets were established for the night. The next morning, General Dan Sickles, commander of the III Corps, took note of a large Confederate column advancing along Catherine Furnace. Believing the column to be a flanking maneuver, Sickles ordered the 20th Indiana, along with the rest of Birney's division, forward to disrupt it. The division ran headlong into the 23rd Georgia Vol. Regt., routing and capturing hundreds of unsuspecting Georgians. The division advanced further and eventually stopped past a railroad cut near Welford House. While the surprise was sudden and very unwelcome for the Georgians, General Jackson had taken the calculated risk. Understanding that his movements along Catherine Furnace were being watched by the Union, Jackson had gone ahead and sent numerous regiments and supply trains down the road, seemingly daring the Union troops to come and attack them. When the Union did as Jackson expected, he took the opportunity to quickly surround the troops, which were suddenly separated from the main force.

During the night of May 2–3, the 20th Indiana regularly increased their picket line until it was evident that they were surrounded by Confederates. By Midnight, they had learned that the Confederates had attacked the right flank of the army, cutting them off. Silently, the 20th Indiana and 63rd Pennsylvania withdrew their pickets and attempted to return to the line in the darkness, at points getting so close to enemy encampments that they could hear role being called. Upon successfully returning to the line, the 20th Indiana was placed in a new line supporting the artillery of Battery E, 1st Rhode Island Artillery, where they remained until the close of the battle. The regiment was attacked often, each time successfully repulsing the attacks.

== Gettysburg ==
The beating that the 20th Indiana received on July 2 on Houck's Ridge was severe. The regiment suffered 152 casualties, of which 32 were killed outright including Col. John Wheeler who was struck, fell from his horse and died. Capt. Gilbreath recalled that it was a “sorrowful little band” after their participation in the battle. Oliver P. Rood, a private, earned the Medal of Honor on the third day of the battle for capturing the flag of the 21st North Carolina Infantry Regiment.

== Total strength and casualties ==
Upon its inception, the 20th Indiana had 1403 men. During the war, 201 men were killed in action, and 570 were wounded, 144 were captured, 25 of whom died in Confederate prisons. The regiment had a 14.3% killed to enrollment ratio.

A list of officers killed in action was kept by Capt. Erasmus Corwin Gilbreath of I Company, and is as follows:

- 1st Lt. John W. Andrews, White Oak Swamps, June 30, 1862
- Capt. James. W. Lytle, Orchards, August 19, 1862
- Col. William L. Brown, 2nd bull Run, August 29, 1862
- 1st Lt. Ezra Robbins, Gettysburg, July 2, 1863
- Col. John Wheeler, Gettysburg, July 2, 1863
- Capt. Henry Quigley, Wilderness, May 12, 1864
- Capt. L. D. Corey, Spotsylvania, May 12, 1864
- Capt. John F. Thomas, Spotsylvania, May 12, 1864
- 1st Lt. E. C. Sutherland, Spotslyvania, May 26, 1864
- 1st Lt. J. C. Bartholemew, Spotslyvania, May 28, 1864
- Capt. Lafayette Gordon, Spotsylvania, June 6, 1864
- Capt. Charles A. Bell, Petersburg, July 9, 1864
- Lt. Col. G. W. Meikel, Petersburg, September 10, 1864
- Capt. William P. Thompson, Petersburg, October 7, 1864
- 2nd Lt. William Dickson, died in Prison of wounds, July 1864
- 2nd Lt. Johnathan Robart, died of wounds received at 2nd Bull Run

== Commanders ==
- Colonel William L. Brown (Killed on August 29, 1862, at the Second Battle of Bull Run)
- Colonel John Van Valkenburg (Discharged for disloyalty following Battle of Fredericksburg)
- Colonel John Wheeler (Killed on July 2, 1863, at the Battle of Gettysburg)

== Notable Members ==
- Oliver P. Rood, awarded Medal of Honor for actions at Gettysburg

== See also ==
- List of Indiana Civil War regiments
- Indiana in the Civil War
