= Norman Laurence Gilbreath =

American magician and author (born 1936)

Norman Laurence Gilbreath (born 1936) is an American magician and author known for originating the Gilbreath shuffle. He is also known for Gilbreath's conjecture concerning prime numbers.

== Life and career ==
Gilbreath got a BS in mathematics at University of California, Los Angeles (UCLA). Following graduate work in applied mathematics, which saw him work under C. C. Chang, he spent his career at the Rand Corporation as an expert on compilers and optimization tasks. His book Magic for an Audience was published in 1989 as a series of three articles in Genii Magazine. He lives in Los Angeles and performed regularly in the 2000s at Hollywood's Magic Castle.

The Gilbreath shuffle is a method of shuffling a deck of cards, by riffling two packs of cards after reversing one of them. Unlike a standard riffle, it preserves certain properties of the sequence of cards, leading to its use in magic tricks. Gilbreath introduced the Gilbreath principle – the basis of card tricks using the Gilbreath shuffle – in 1958 in an article in Genii magazine. In 1966 he published a generalization that is now called the Second Gilbreath principle. This principle became well known after Martin Gardner wrote about it in his July 1972 "Mathematical Games column" in Scientific American.

In number theory, he is known for Gilbreath's conjecture, an unproven pattern in the difference sequences of prime numbers. Gilbreath found this as a student in 1958 at UCLA. Two other students, R. B. Killgrove and K. E. Ralston, took advantage of the SWAC computer installed at UCLA and confirmed it for the first 63419 primes. Unknown to them, the same pattern had been observed many years earlier by François Proth, but it is by Gilbreath's name that the conjecture is now known.

== Books ==
- Magic for an Audience, Genii Magazine, Vol. 52, No. 09-10-11, Spring 1989.
- Beyond Imagination, Publisher: H&R Magic Books (2014).
