= John Wheeler (colonel) =

- Col. John Wheeler, Commander 20th Indiana Infantry Regiment
- Born: February 6, 1825; Connecticut, US
- Died: July 2, 1863 (aged 38); Gettysburg, Pennsylvania, US
- Burial place: Maplewood Cemetery, Crown Point
- Military career
- Allegiance: United States; Union
- Branch: US Army
- Service years: 1861–1863
- Rank: Colonel, U.S.V.
- Commands: 20th Regiment Indiana Infantry
- Conflicts: American Civil War: Battle of Hampton Roads; Peninsula Campaign; Second Battle of Bull Run; Battle of Fredericksburg; Battle of Chancellorsville; Battle of Gettysburg
- Other work: farmer, teacher

John Wheeler was a Union colonel during the American Civil War. Wheeler's regiment suffered heavy losses at the Battle of Gettysburg where he was killed in action at Rose Woods, near Devil's Den.

== Biography ==
=== Early life ===
John Wheeler was born in Connecticut but moved to Indiana in 1847. He settled in Lake County, Indiana where he worked as a farmer and teacher. He and his father worked at draining swamplands in the region. He was elected County Surveyor in 1853 and later established a newspaper called the Crown Point Register.

=== Civil War Service ===
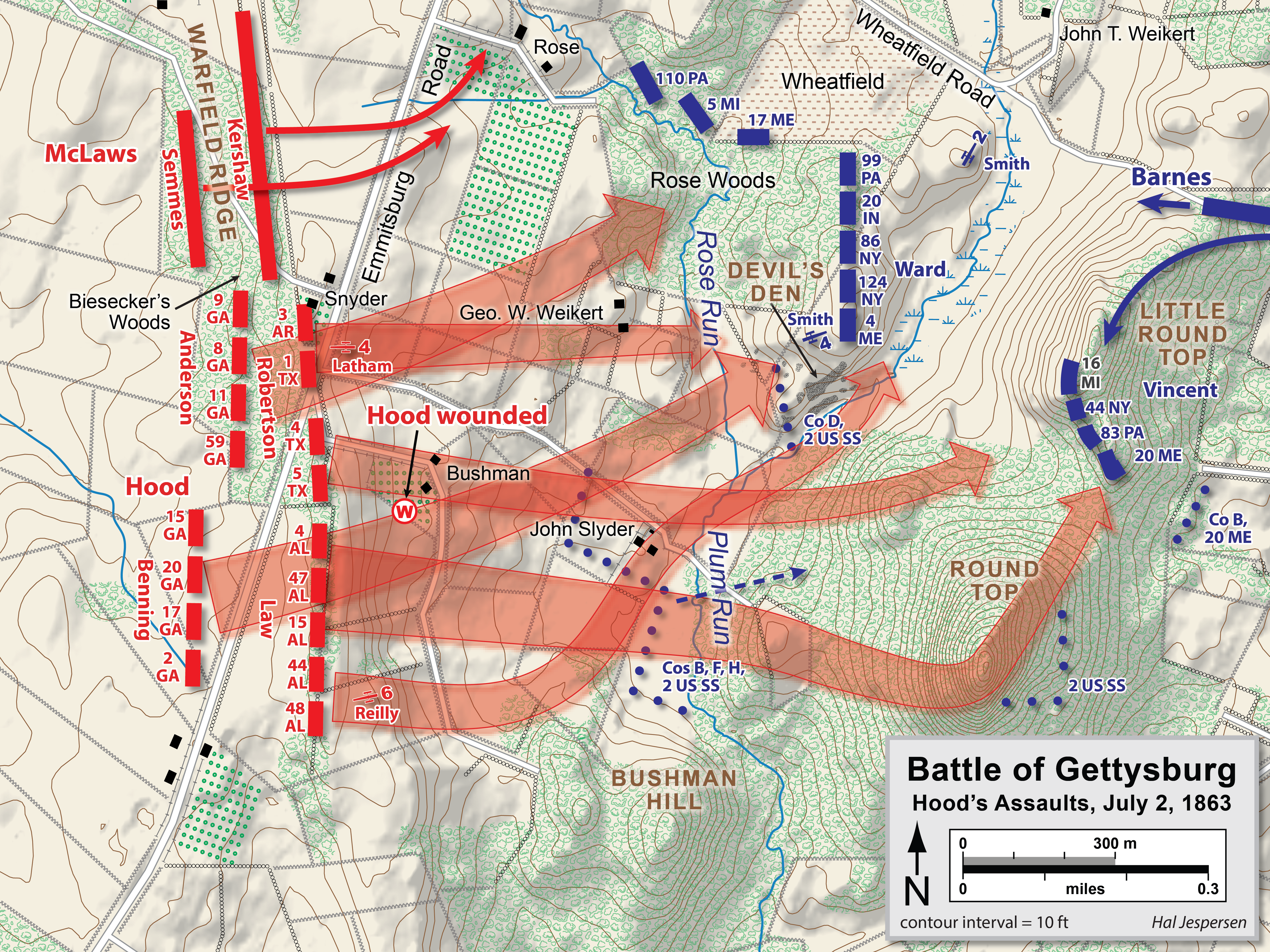
Position of the 20th Indiana in the Wheatfield on the morning of July 2.

Wheeler used his own money and influence to raise a company of local volunteers for service in the Civil War. This company elected him captain and joined the 20th Indiana Volunteer Regiment in 1861 where it was being organized at Lafayette, Indiana. He was transferred to eastern Virginia and posted at Fortress Monroe during the battle of Hampton Roads. Wheeler and his regiment joined the III Corps and participated in the Peninsula Campaign and the second Battle of Bull Run. At Bull Run, Wheeler, (now a major) temporarily assumed command of the regiment after Colonel William L. Brown was killed. Due to heavy losses the entire III Corps was taken out of active duty during the Maryland Campaign to regain lost numbers. Wheeler and the rest of the III Corps returned to the Army of the Potomac during the battle of Fredericksburg. In 1863 Wheeler was now promoted to colonel and assumed command of the regiment. He led it into action at the battles of Chancellorsville and Gettysburg. At Gettysburg Wheeler was part of J. H. Hobart Ward's Brigade of David B. Birney's Division in the vicinity of Devil's Den and Rose Woods. During James Longstreet's attack, on the second day, the 20th Indiana was hit hard. While riding on horseback with his men Colonel Wheeler was hit in the temple and killed instantly. His body was returned to Indiana and buried in Maplewood Cemetery in Crown Point.

=== Legacy ===
Colonel Wheeler's name is inscribed on the 20th Indiana's regimental monument located near the site where he fell. The Colonel John Wheeler Middle School in Crown Point is also named in his honor.
