= Erasmus Corwin Gilbreath =

US Army major (1840–1898)

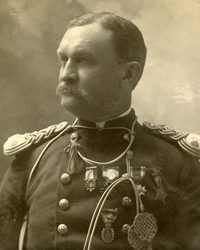
- Last formal image taken of Maj. Gilbreath, 1897-1898
- Born: May 13, 1840; Guernsey County, Ohio, US
- Died: August 22, 1898 (aged 58); Mayagüez, Puerto Rico
- Burial place: Arlington National Cemetery
- Spouse: Susan Corse Gilbreath
- Relatives: William Sydnor Gilbreath (Son); Etta Moore Gilbreath(Daughter); Nan Lott Edwards(Daughter); Erasmus Gilbreath(Son)
- Military career
- Allegiance: United States of America
- Branch: United States Army
- Service years: 1861-1898
- Rank: 1st Lieutenant; Captain; Major
- Units: 20th Indiana Volunteer Infantry Regiment; 15th Infantry Regiment; 11th Infantry Regiment
- Conflicts: American Civil War; Battle of the Ironclads; Seven Days Battles; Second Battle of Bull Run; Battle of Fredericksburg; Battle of Chancellorsville; Battle of Gettysburg; Kelly's Ford; Battle of the Crater; Battle of the Wilderness; Battle of Spotsylvania; Siege of Petersburg; American Indian Wars; Spanish-American War
- Awards: Posthumously eligible for: Civil War Campaign Medal; Indian Campaign Medal; Army of Puerto Rican Occupation Medal; Spanish Campaign Medal; Purple Heart

Erasmus Corwin Gilbreath (May 13, 1840 – August 22, 1898) was a major in the United States Army who began his 37-year career as a first lieutenant in the 20th Indiana Volunteer Infantry Regiment. Gilbreath was involved in numerous battles during the American Civil War, such as Gettysburg and bearing witness to the battle between the CSS Virginia and the USS Monitor, the American Indian Wars, in which he helped establish Fort Custer, and the Spanish–American War. Gilbreath is buried in Arlington National Cemetery with his wife, Susan, and daughter, Etta.

== Early life ==
Gilbreath was born on May 13, 1840, in Guernsey County, Ohio, to Fortunatus Sydnor Gilbreath and Rachel Moore Lansing, the oldest of three children. In the 1850s, the family moved to Chicago by way of Michigan City, Indiana. Relatives in Michigan City convinced the Gilbreath family to settle in Valparaiso, rather than Chicago. In 1853, shortly after Erasmus finished school, his father died. Erasmus was left to take care of the family, studying law under Mark L. De Motte, a future member of Congress. According to Gilbreath, his studies had progressed to such an extent that shortly before the war broke out, with only a few months' work, he would be "admitted to practice at the Bar".

== 20th Indiana Volunteer Regiment ==
=== Regiment Creation ===
In April 1861, President Abraham Lincoln called for 75,000 volunteers to serve in the militia for a period of three months. Gilbreath admits that initially he had no intention of joining the army; however, a visit from a former employer, J. W. Lytle, quickly changed his mind. Lytle had met a Mexican War veteran named W.L. Brown, who had asked Lytle to help raise a rifle company in answer to President Lincoln's call. Brown had been given authority from the Secretary of War in Washington to raise such a company, and promised Lytle a position of command if he should assist in raising it.

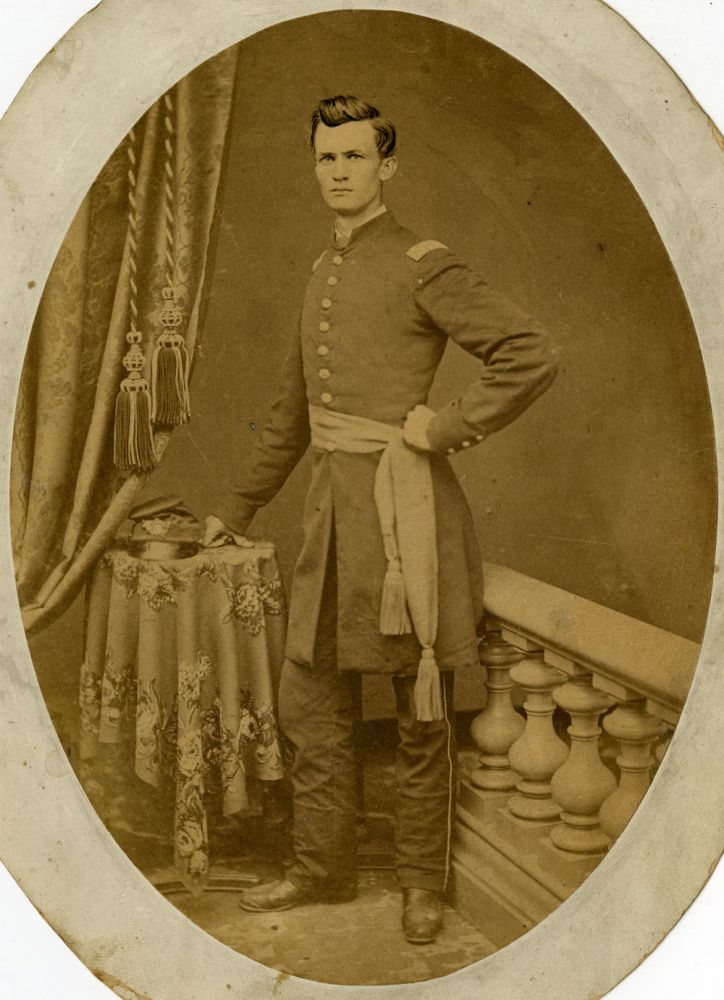
Erasmus Gilbreath in Uniform, 1860s.

Lytle met with Gilbreath on June 5, 1861. The next day they informed Porter County's local populace of their intentions and that in Valparaiso on June 15 there would be a grand meeting at the courthouse in order to set up the regiment. Gilbreath states astonishedly in his journal that "nearly everybody in the county came to Valparaiso, and so great was the enthusiasm that, in an hour after the meeting was called, we had enrolled 150 men or 50 more than we needed". At this point, with the company recruited, officers were to be picked. Unlike modern armies, American militia units of the Civil War era often picked their own leaders. This was held by a vote among all the men of the unit, with each officer being nominated and then voted on. When voting occurred in Gilbreath's company, Lytle insisted that Gilbreath be elected captain, while Gilbreath insisted the opposite. Lytle was elected Captain of the company, with Gilbreath being elected 1st Lieutenant.

W.L. Brown, as the organizer of the regiment, was made colonel and fixed the date of July 4, 1861, as the date for all the companies to leave home and rendezvous at Lafayette. Gilbreath describes that "almost every man, woman, and child was at Valparaiso" and that the only music to be hear was fife and drum, which were being played by the Sheriff and Blacksmith, both of whom were "only to anxious to march us to the railroad station and to go with us to Lafayette". Their train did not make any stops, but rather rode straight through to Lafayette, where the Regiment was fully assembled. The 20th Indiana Volunteer Regiment was mustered into service with the United States on the 22nd of July, 1861, with Gilbreath's company being assigned as "I" company.

The regiment left Lafayette on the 24th of July for Indianapolis, where they would be properly outfitted with standard US Army uniforms and equipment. While the officers of each company were told to procure their uniforms and weapons on their own, the enlisted men of the regiment received their equipment from the government supply. According to Gilbreath, the troops expected to be equipped with the new Springfield Model 1855. At that point in the war, the government did not have enough rifles to equip both the regular army as well as the newly recruited regiments, leading the government to substitute the more modern rifles with the much older Model 1795 Musket, which had been modified to use percussion caps. The regiment was reportedly so disgusted with their equipment that they threw their weapons down in the street in indignation. The Governor attempted to cool the situation by promising the first few companies would have the new model rifles at an expedited time and the rest of the regiment would have them as soon as possible.

The Regiment was then transferred to Baltimore. Due to the relatively recent anti-war Baltimore riot of 1861, the large numbers of anti-war and southern sympathizers, and the potentially tenuous hold on the Baltimore and Ohio Railroad line leading into Baltimore, one of Gilbreath's first tasks was to guard a series of bridges. Upon arriving in Baltimore, Col. Brown ordered the regiment to march with their muskets loaded, due to fear of another riot breaking out. From Baltimore, the regiment was sent by steamship to Fort Monroe, where they were camped until September 26. During their time at Fort Monroe, Gilbreath records little else other than marching and drilling for practice.

=== Action at Hatteras Inlet ===
On September 26, the regiment moved from Fort Monroe to Fort Hatteras, recently taken from the Confederates during the Battle of Hatteras Inlet Batteries, on Hatteras Island in preparation for an assault against Confederate troops defending further up the inlet. Gilbreath was deployed with 500 men in 7 companies to Chicamacomico Beach on September 29, 1861. Their main objective was to dislodge an enemy force from Roanoke Island. The commanding officer of Fort Hatteras was in such a haste to have this objective accomplished that the men landed at Chicamacomico Beach without supplies or tents. Regimental Quartermaster Isaac W. Hart and a small detail arrived with proper supplies on October 1. However, the gunboat carrying Hart and the supplies was attacked by three Confederate gunboats shortly after Hart began unloading the supplies that afternoon. Hart and 47 men were taken prisoner, and the supplies to be delivered to Gilbreath were taken as the spoils of war by the Confederates. The commanding officer of Fort Hatteras sent supplies on October 3, which were very welcomed by the men.

On the morning of October 4, Gilbreath sighted a Confederate fleet of nine ships steaming towards the current position of the detachment. It was believed that the fleet was carrying a detachment of Confederate soldiers that was destined to sail below Gilbreath's current position to cut them off from Fort Hatteras. A decision was made by Col. Brown based on these assumptions to retreat back to Fort Hatteras.

In the evening, it was decided that a skirmish line should be formed to defend against attack should the Confederates succeed in landing. Gilbreath was put in charge of forming this line, and stated that he 'never did harder work'. Gilbreath set about improvising means of attaining water and cups, as their supplies were short. He managed this by finding large shells on the beach and utilizing them as drinking cups as well as shovels to dig for water. The entire detachment reached Hatteras Lighthouse around 10 or 11 o'clock that night.

The next morning, October 5, it was discovered that a Georgia regiment had pursued the Union detachment through the night, and that they were camped barely four or five miles from the Hatteras Lighthouse. Under the cover of the Frigate Minnesota, the detachment completed their march back towards Fort Hatteras that day without further incident. It was later learned that the Confederate landing force that had attempted to cut off the Union detachment at Chicamacomico Beach had run aground, and that in comparison to the 500 Union soldiers of the 20th Indiana Vol. Regiment, the Confederates had over 2000 Georgian troops with which to face them.

Little occurred following October 5. On November 3, a steamship arrived with the much-anticipated shipment of rifles. On November 10, the regiment was ordered back to Fort Monroe.

=== Battle of the Ironclads ===
While stationed at Fort Monroe in the early part of 1862, Gilbreath bore witness to the Battle of Hampton Roads, in which the CSS Virginia (also written as CSS Merrimack) and USS Monitor battled for control of Hampton Roads, a roadstead in Virginia where the Elizabeth and Nansemond Rivers meet the James River just before it enters Chesapeake Bay adjacent to the city of Norfolk. Gilbreath and the rest of the 20th Indiana assisted in the battle by helping wounded sailors from the USS Congress and USS Cumberland to shore as well as providing supporting fire with small arms and artillery. Gilbreath describes the battle in great detail, noting that the moon (on the night of March 8) "seemed paler in the light of the burning Congress. She burned slowly, and for hours the flames seemed to be playing with the huge vessel whose hull stood forth so massive and black". Gilbreath remained with the 20th Indiana until the 10 May 1862, when the regiment was ordered to take Norfolk. This was accomplished without much resistance from Confederate forces.

=== Seven Days Battles ===
Following the Battle of Seven Pines, the 20th Indiana was transferred to service with the Army of the Potomac under the command of General George B. McClellan. The regiment was assigned to the 1st Brigade ("Robinson's Brigade"), of the 3rd Division (Kearney's Division), of the 3rd Corps, commanded by General Samuel P. Heintzelman. Gilbreath and the 20th Indiana would see action at various points during the Seven Days Battles.

==== Oak Grove ====
Gilbreath's first land battle occurred on June 19, when a small Confederate force attacked the picket line of the 20th Indiana at 4:30 a.m. It is unclear what actions Gilbreath took or performed during this skirmish; however, Gilbreath reports that against an estimated 300 enemy troops, the regiment took only 3 casualties.

Gilbreath saw heavier fighting on June 25 with the commencement of the Battle of Oak Grove. The only tactical advance during McClellan's Peninsula campaign, a Union attack on Confederate positions began at approximately 8 a.m. on the 25th, with the 20th Indiana situated on the extreme left of the advancing Union picket line. Gilbreath reports that General Joseph Hooker's Division, which formed the right side of the assault, met with heavy resistance, but still managed to accomplish its objectives by pushing the Confederates back through three picket lines. General Heintzelman ordered artillery support for Hooker's division, which put an end to immediate Confederate resistance in that area. The pressure at that point shifted towards the left flank of the Union advance, which contained the 20th Indiana. Gilbreath reported that a sudden Confederate attack came at 5:30 p.m., as the 20th Indiana was preparing to charge across an open field. The attack was focused on the 87th New York Volunteer Regiment, which was on the 20th Indiana's right flank. The 87th New York broke, leaving the right flank of the 20th Indiana exposed to the Confederate assault. Gilbreath reports that after heavy fighting, he was driven back with his regiment a short distance. The regiment was then rallied, and retook their previously held positions and held off three more Confederate assaults. Gilbreath reports that the regiment lost 125 men, comprising almost a fifth of the casualties incurred by the entire 3rd Corps during the day's fighting. During the battle, Captain Lytle, commander of I Company, was mortally wounded.

The day after the battle of Oak Grove, the right flank of the Army, located north of the Chickahominy River, was attacked by forces from General Daniel Harvey Hill. The right flank, made up of the 5th Corps under the command of General Fitz-John Porter, broke during an attack on the 27th of June due to lack of support and retreated across the Chickahominy towards the main battle force on the southern side of the Chickahominy. It was at this point that McClellan believed it best to retreat back to the James River.

==== Battle of Savage's Station and Glendale ====
The 20th Indiana was witness to the initial attack on Savage's Station; however, Gilbreath does not note if the regiment took part in the first engagement. Gilbreath does document that the 20th Indiana formed the rear guard along with Battery G of the 2nd US Artillery. The 20th Indiana halted two Confederate assaults that were intended to destroy a larger part of the routing Union army, as well as enduring an artillery barrage from Confederate railroad artillery. The regiment remained at their station until they were ordered to retreat towards Glendale sometime during the night. Gilbreath records that General Kearney cited the commander of the 20th Indiana, Col. Brown, as distinguishing himself and his regiment in battle.

The regiment arrived at the newly formed picket line at Glendale the next day and took part in the battle of Glendale. Gilbreath's company remained in the rear behind a breastwork constructed of logs and rails, which Gilbreath claimed saved countless lives. The regiment performed with great coolness, according to a superior officer, taking only 34 casualties during the battle.

Although the regiment was present at the Battle of Malvern Hill, the final battle of the Seven Days Battles, Gilbreath claims that the regiment was not directly engaged.

=== Second Battle of Bull Run ===
On August 20, Gilbreath was promoted to captain and given full command of I Company, 20th Indiana Volunteers, following the death of Captain Lytle. Gilbreath records that the Lytle's death was very unwelcome, as he had been a family friend. In the following days, the I Company camped near Rappahannock Station, a railroad station bordering the Rappahannock River. Early on the 27th of August, Gilbreath was awoken by artillery fire from the direction of Washington. A Confederate force under the command of Stonewall Jackson had broken through Union lines and was gathering in force at Manassas Junction. Gilbreath hurried his company to action, and the entire regiment marched toward Manassas Junction. The regiment arrived on the 28th of August and formed a skirmish line between two columns on the right flank of the 3rd Division. The Division did not make contact with Jackson at Manassas Junction and pursued him towards Centerville.

On the morning of the 29th, the Division maneuvred into a position opposing Jackson on what Gilbreath called "roughly the same ground on which the Battle of Bull Run had been fought a year earlier", with the major difference being the position of the two armies was reversed. The 20th Indiana's position during the battle was on the extreme right flank of the Union lines. Gilbreath mentions that this relieved the regiment from the more severe part of the fighting; however, the regiment still lost about the same number of men as the rest of the units in the battle. Most of the regiment's losses occurred during the initial advance from the Union positions towards the railroad, which served as a sort of breastwork for the defending Confederate army. Upon securing this position, the regiment wheeled left and hid among the undergrowth along the railroad. This order was given by General Kearney in an attempt to relieve pressure in the center of the Union battle line, which was beginning to break up. The Confederate forces charged this line, bypassing the 20th Indiana without noticing them. At some point during this, Gilbreath's company opened fire from their hiding spot and charged the advancing enemy in the flank. I Company's counterattack was immensely successful, taking the Confederates completely by surprise and forcing them to withdraw from the immediate area. Shortly after this action, Colonel Brown, commander of the regiment, was shot through the head by a Confederate sharpshooter. Major John Wheeler, previously commander of B Company, assumed command of the regiment.

The regiment remained on the field throughout the night and did not take direct part in the action on the following day. Gilbreath records having a "wonderful and awe-inspiring picture of disaster" as his regiment observed General Longstreet roll up the Union left flank. The regiment was ordered to retreat with the rest of the army that evening. On the 31st of August, the regiment was moved to provide assistance to General Reno in resisting a Confederate attack. No assistance was rendered due to the death of General Kearney, who was killed while scouting ahead of the regiment.

=== Battle of Fredericksburg ===
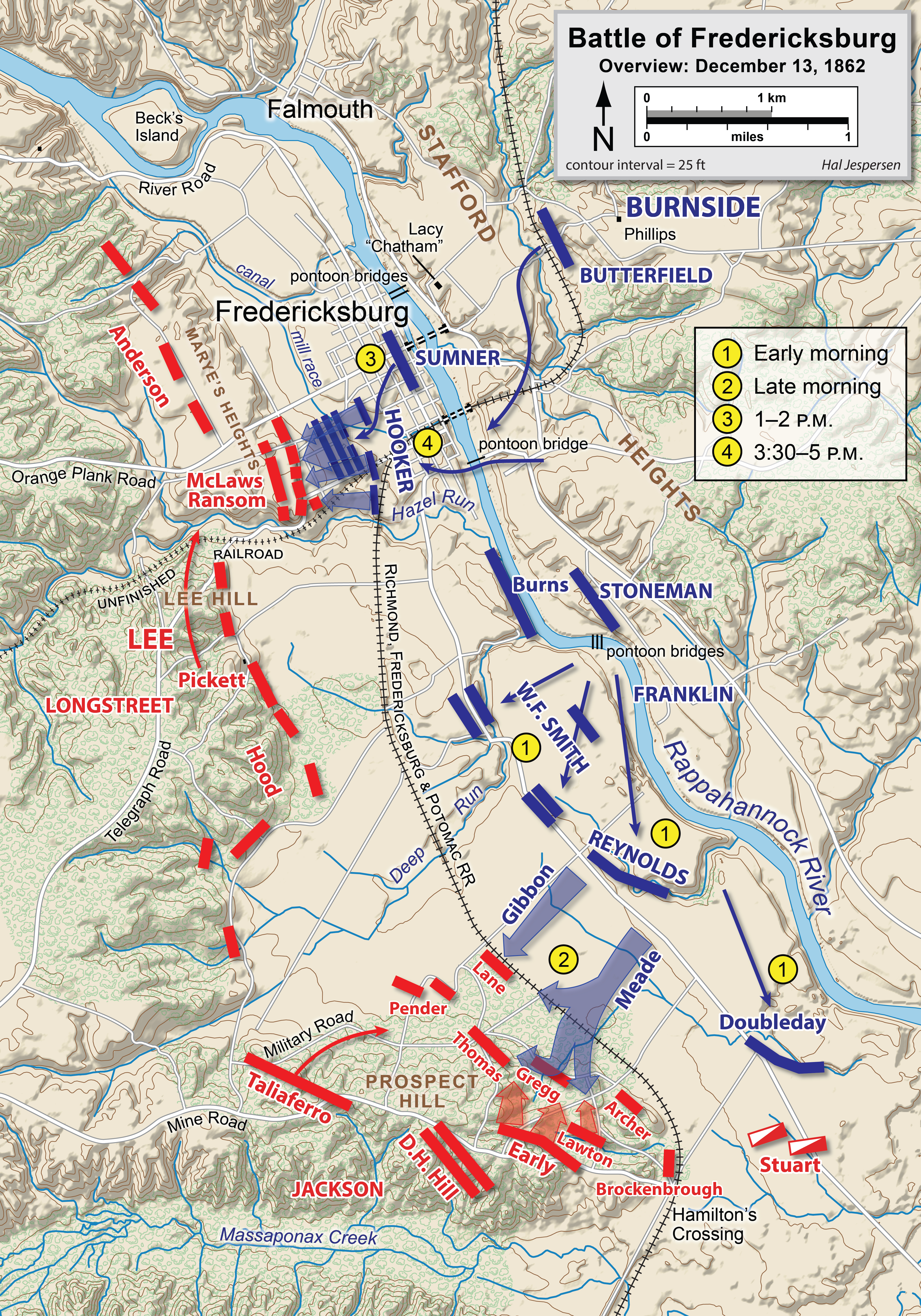
Map of the Battle of Fredericksburg. The yellow box indicates the area where the 20th Indiana and Erasmus Gilbreath saw action.

Following the Second Battle of Bull Run, the regiment, along with the entire 3rd Corps, encamped along the southern side of the Potomac for an extended time due to a lack of combat-ready troops. The 20th was briefly put back into action to counter a raid by the Confederate General J.E.B. Stuart. During Stuarts's Chambersburg Raid, Gilbreath documents that the only contact made with the enemy was the observance of them falling back across the Potomac after successfully completing their raid.

While the regiment camped at Poolesville, Gilbreath was ordered to return to Washington in order to gather up wounded soldiers for his division and return with them. Spending roughly five days in Washington, Gilbreath made his way back to the division by way of the Chesapeake and Ohio Canal with approximately 350 men. Gilbreath had difficulty controlling the men, as they would frequently wander off from camp, with Gilbreath stating that neither "moral suasion or profanity had any effect on this crowd".

The 20th Indiana began moving on October 26 in accordance with General McClellan's plan to meet the Confederate army in Virginia. During this march, General McClellan was relieved from duty by Washington, as President Lincoln felt McClellan was acting too slowly to guarantee the end of the war. This action was met with hostility by many men under McClellan's command. Although Gilbreath does not directly voice his own opinion of McClellan's removal, he does mention an opinion that had McClellan remained in command of the Army of the Potomac, he would likely have continued to be "slow in his movements". General Burnside was given command of the Army of the Potomac and devised a plan to take Richmond. Rather than using the tenuous hold on the railroad from Manassas as his direct means of supply, Burnside planned to ford the Rappahannock River at Fredericksburg, allowing him to use the extensive river system as a more lucrative supply line as well as force Lee into an open battle. However, due to delays in supply and Burnside's tendency to give confusing and poorly worded orders, he was not able to begin building the necessary pontoon bridges across the Rappahannock River until early December, by which time Lee had already entrenched his men on the heights behind the town.

The 20th Indiana was moved to a point roughly 8 or 9 miles north of Fredericksburg, where they made camp. The 20th Indiana occupied this camp for the duration of the winter of 1862-1863. The regiment saw action during the battle on December 13, when they crossed the Rappahannock River and charged Confederate positions along Marye's Heights. Gilbreath was wounded in the leg during this action. During the charge, Gilbreath suddenly noticed his right leg "would not do its duty". Gilbreath looked down and saw a hole where the bullet had entered his leg, and fell to the ground. He lay on the ground from about 2 P.M., when his regiment had charged the Confederate positions, until about 8 or 9 P.M., when a sergeant from his company was able to retrieve him. During the hours he was immobile on the battlefield, Gilbreath witnessed regiments and brigades from Sumner's and Hooker's division charge against the Confederate positions on Marye's Heights, where Longstreet's veterans had taken up positions behind a stone wall. Gilbreath was taken to a house in the town of Fredericksburg, which served as a distribution point for the wounded of the battle. The wounded would be transferred to their respective Corps hospitals across the river, out of danger. However, if a wound was found to be too severe, such as Gilbreath's was, the surgeons at the house would perform the necessary operations. Surgeons believed that Gilbreath's wound was too serious to be treated, and he would need his right leg amputated. By chance, a Confederate artillery round hit the roof of the house. In the confusion, Gilbreath recognized one of the surgeons and got his attention. The surgeon made sure that Gilbreath was transported to the 3rd Corps hospital for proper treatment. After receiving medical attention at the 3rd Corps hospital, he was sent back to Washington to properly recover. Gilbreath spent a total of four months in Washington, reporting back for duty on April 1, 1863. Though he was able to keep his leg, Gilbreath continued to walk with a limp for the rest of his life.

=== Battle of Chancellorsville ===
Battle Map of the Battle of Fredericksburg on May 2, 1863. Approximate position of the 20th Indiana and Erasmus Gilbreath at the end of the day shown in yellow box.

Upon Gilbreath's return to the 20th Indiana, General Joseph Hooker had replaced General Burnside as commander of the Army of the Potomac. Hooker had devised a plan that would force Lee out of his trenches near Fredericksburg and into an open fight, where sheer force of numbers would crush Lee. Hooker attempted this by splitting his army into three parts; one part was sent as a feint towards Fredericksburg, to keep Lee well entrenched, while the other was sent towards Chancellorsville to flank Lee's trenches and force him into a pincer.

The 3rd Corps, of which the 20th Indiana was a part, moved later than the majority of the units, but arrived at Chancellorsville by 11 A.M. on May 1. The regiment established a camp along a small stream called "Scott's Run". General Daniel Sickles, current commander of the 3rd Corps, ordered the 20th Indiana into action upon seeing enemy movement in the vicinity of a railroad cut. The 20th Indiana advanced towards the cut and "captured nearly the whole of the 23rd Georgia Volunteer Regiment". At the point when the 20th Indiana stumbled upon the 23rd Georgia, the Georgian regiment had been in total disarray and was taken by total surprise by the advancing Indianans. After advancing approximately a quarter mile further, the 3rd Corps halted at Welford House. The Corps was 3 miles in advance of the rest of the army.

General Jackson launched a flank attack on the Union army at approximately 6 p.m., breaking the Union flank. This action cut the 3rd Corps off from the rest of the army, a fact Gilbreath learned at midnight. Gathering his company, Gilbreath and the rest of the Corps attempted to return north under the cover of darkness and link up with main elements of the army. Gilbreath recalls that at points his company was close enough to the Confederate lines that roll call could be clearly heard coming from Confederate companies.

Third Corps was able to link up with the right flank of the army in the early morning of May 3, and the 20th Indiana was put into position in the rear of Chancellor House, where they remained until the army withdrew.

=== Gettysburg ===
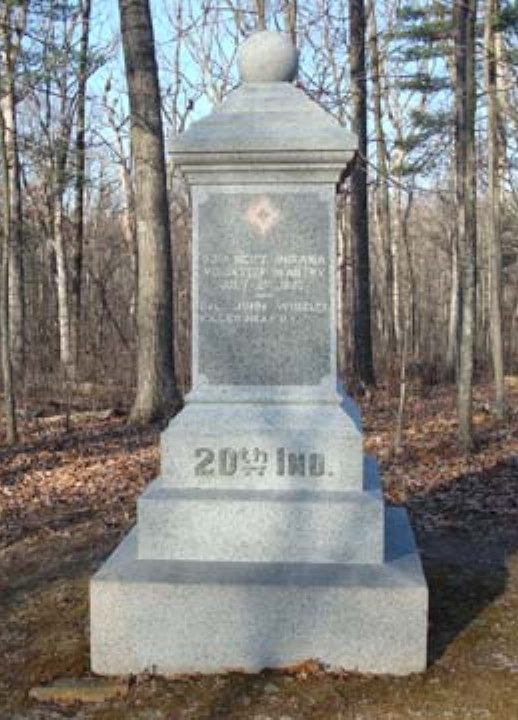
Monument commemorating the actions of the 20th Indiana Regiment and the death of Col. Wheeler at the Battle of Gettysburg. The monument is located at the battle site, near Devil's Den.

On July 1, General David B. Birney ordered the 20th Indiana to Gettysburg. They had been camped between Taneytown and Bridgeport. The regiment arrived at 10:30 at night, taking positions along the right side of Cemetery Hill.

As part of General Daniel Sickles' III Corps, Gilbreath's regiment was moved along with the rest of Sickles' defensive line roughly a half-mile in front of Cemetery Ridge early on July 2, with the 20th Indiana finally defending a position locally known as Devil's Den. Sickles moved his line without permission from General Meade in order to occupy slightly higher ground. Although this did give Sickles' troops a slight advantage in height, it opened a salient along the Union lines. By the time Meade learned of Sickles' unauthorized maneuver, it was too late to move the troops back without endangering them to the enemy's assault.

The Confederate assault under General Longstreet began at 4 P.M. along Sickles' line. The most savage fighting, according to James McPherson, occurred in the Peach Orchard, a wheat field near by the orchard, at Little Round Top, and Devil's Den. The current commanding officer of the 20th Indiana, Maj. John B. Wheeler, was shot through the temple by a Confederate sharpshooter. Gilbreath, being the most senior officer available in the regiment, took temporary command. Gilbreath sent a messenger to General Ward requesting a resupply of ammunition. An aide of General Ward returned with orders for Gilbreath to hold his position using all possible ammunition at his current disposal, including stripping the wounded and dead for ammunition if necessary. If ammunition ran out or the situation became too tenuous to hold, Gilbreath was given permission to retreat back to Cemetery ridge. The 20th Indiana, under Gilbreath's leadership, held its position throughout the day, incurring 156 casualties.

On July 3, Gilbreath and his company witnessed Picket's Charge. Gilbreath does not explicitly mention his company taking part in the fight, but gives a detailed account of the conflict in his journal. Gilbreath was removed from temporary command of the 20th Indiana, with Lt. Col. Taylor, originally from Company G, being promoted to full colonel.

=== New York Draft Riot ===
Along with the 1st Massachusetts, 37th Massachusetts, and 5th Wisconsin regiments, the 20th Indiana was called to New York on July 30, 1863, to help suppress the insurrection surrounding the recently instated draft. The regiment arrived on the 2nd of August, and fixing bayonets, cleared Battery Park of rioters. The regiment made camp in Battery Park that night, with Gilbreath mentioning that the rioters were still so violent that a picket line of approximately one man per five yards had to be established to keep order. The next day, Gilbreath was ordered to take four companies to Gramercy Park, where they would make camp and guard a nearby armory. The rioters subsided, Gilbreath attributing this to the sheer number of men from the Army of the Potomac stationed in New York, and the regiment left New York three weeks later.

=== Siege of Petersburg and mustering out of service ===
Prior to the siege of Petersburg, Gilbreath was given command of 800 engineers to create the breastworks for the siege. This was done during the night of June 21–22, 1864. The Regiment took part in the siege until the end of July, when they were pulled back behind the lines for rest. In August, it was decided to make a feint towards Washington. The regiment marched toward Washington, and was loaded onto ships and taken closer to Confederate lines. The following First Battle of Deep Bottom saw the 20th Indiana capture a hidden Confederate artillery battery. This was done by Gilbreath, who tied a red handkerchief to a stick, mimicking a signal flag. The Confederate batteries mistook Gilbreath's handkerchief for an actual signal flag, opening fire and giving away their position.

The regiment returned to the Petersburg works on 18 August. During their final deployment at Petersburg, the commanding officer of the regiment was shot by a Confederate sharpshooter and killed. Gilbreath, being the most senior officer then in the regiment, expected to be promoted to full command of the regiment. However, this did not come to fruition as, rather than adding recruits to the Indiana regiment, other regiments were consolidated with it to bring it back up to strength. Aside from keeping some support officers, such as the Chaplain and Surgeon, all previous officers of the regiment were mustered out, and officers of those regiments being consolidated into the 20th Indiana were given command. Gilbreath was among the officers mustered out, his date of discharge from the regiment being October 19, 1864.

== Postwar service ==
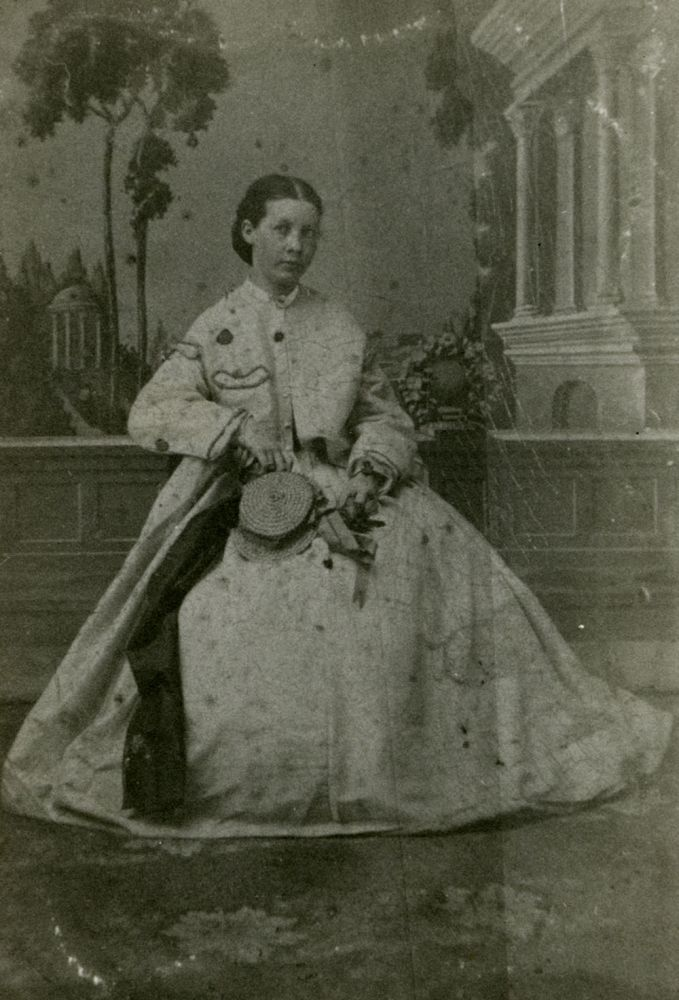
Susan Corse Gilbreath, 1861

Upon discharge from the 20th Indiana Volunteers, Gilbreath accepted a commission as a Captain and Assistant Quartermaster of Volunteers on January 25, 1865, and one month later was given a commission in "Hancock's Corps", which was to be composed of Veterans of the Civil War. Upon being discharged from his Quartermaster position on July 28, 1865, he was commissioned as a first lieutenant in the United States Regular Army in the 15th Infantry Regiment on February 23, 1866. Two months later, Gilbreath married Susan Coale Corse at the house of Joseph Pancoast in Baltimore on April 23, by Rev. Barrett of a Baptist church. His first son, William Sydnor Gilbreath, was born nearly a year later on January 24, 1867.

=== Duties in Mississippi ===
Gilbreath was attached to C Company, which was based in Grenada, Mississippi. Gilbreath's duties in Mississippi focused on reconstruction of the state, such as selecting or recommending suitable men for civil office in the local counties and acting as a judge for complaints made by freed slaves. As part of his military service, Gilbreath was made an officer in the Freedmen's Bureau. When hearing complaints from freedmen against their former owners, Gilbreath often found in favor of the freedmen, requiring the owner to pay money to their former slaves. Gilbreath states that it was extremely difficult to make many southerners understand that their slaves were now free, leading to Gilbreath establishing a sort of peonage, where the former owners would give the slaves a portion of their crop. This sometimes proved ineffective since the whites controlled the supply of all goods; they were able to keep freedmen constantly in debt. According to Gilbreath, this was not a very normal occurrence, and many people of the South did their best to accommodate the newly freed blacks. Gilbreath oversaw the elections of civil officials, with a focus on keeping whites from changing the black vote.

Gilbreath also encountered the beginnings of the Ku Klux Klan in Mississippi. Their objectives were simply to scare freedmen and workers of the Freedmen's Bureau. As the Klan garbed themselves in white hoods and planned their attacks in relative secrecy, there was little Gilbreath could do to stop the attacks until they had started.

Gilbreath reported that all southerners, with the exception of a Col. Howard, with whom Mr. and Mrs. Gilbreath boarded, and Jefferson Davis and his family, were extremely hostile to any member of the United States Army. On several occasions, members of the community would ride out during the night and discharge pistols in front of the home Gilbreath was staying at in order to scare him and his wife out. On other occasions, a band of riders would approach the company's encampment and open fire on the United States flag in a show of open disloyalty and hatred to the "Yankees". Gilbreath quickly put an end to the latter issue by ordering his men to take up arms against the riders the next time they shot at the flag. Gilbreath issued this order in full confidence that no one would be hurt by his troops, as they "could not hit the sides of barns". At the next raid on the flag, his troops took arms against the riders, sending them off in a fright. They were rounded up and brought back to the camp, where Gilbreath lectured them. No further attacks on the flag were made during his time in Mississippi.

=== Duties in Texas ===
Between 1866 and 1869, Gilbreath's 15th Infantry Regiment was reorganized into the 24th Infantry Regiment, and then further into the 11th Infantry Regiment. The 11th Infantry was formed by the consolidation of the 24th Infantry and 29th Infantry in 1869. During this consolidation, the 24th Infantry, Gilbreath's current unit, was transferred to Texas, where the 29th was currently stationed. When Gilbreath arrived in Galveston, where the newly formed 11th was stationed, he was assigned the position of 1st Lt. in Company G, under the command of a Captain S.C. Green.

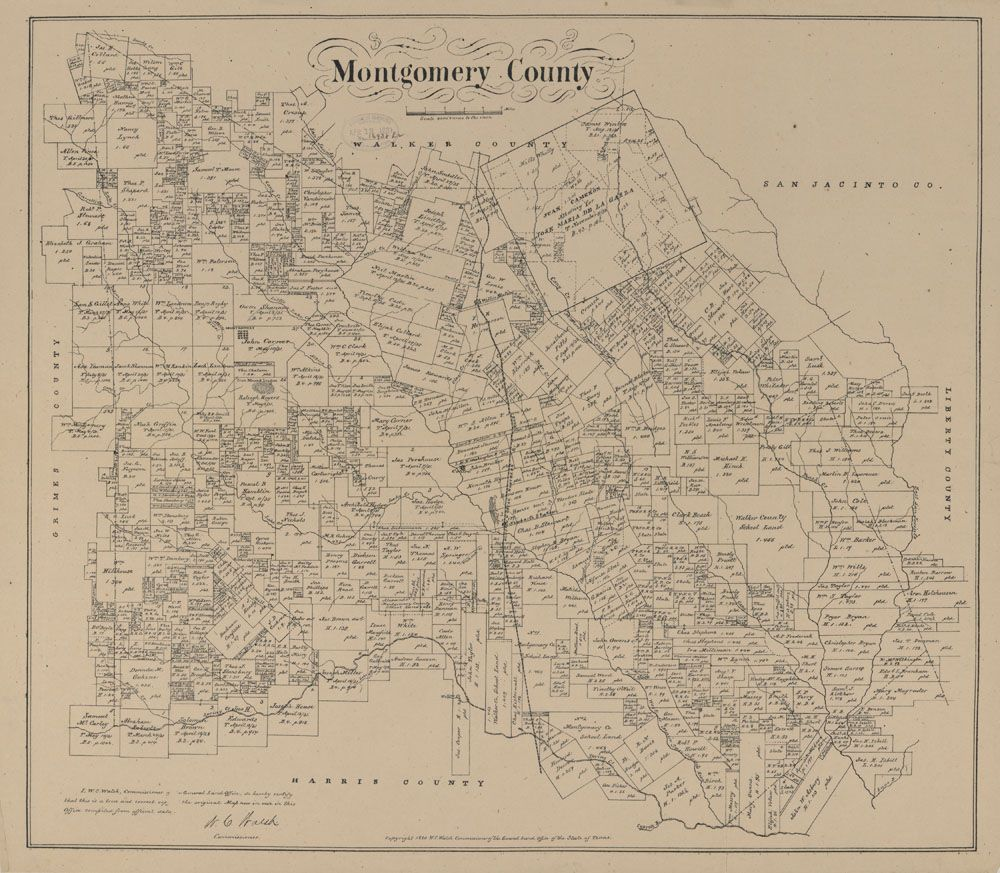
Map of Montgomery County, Texas, which Gilbreath was tasked with reconstructing in 1869

In early September 1869, Gilbreath was selected to carry out reconstruction in Montgomery County, reportedly one of the worst counties in the state. Gilbreath was assigned 30 men from the 10th and 11th Regiments, and upon arrival in the capital of the county, Montgomery, found a total lawless state of affairs. To emphasize this, Gilbreath notes in his journal that before he could select a place to camp in the town, he was approached by a man who wished to report a murder. Churches had not been open in some months, schools were not in existence, and every man was armed with some sort of knife or shotgun, leading to some offenders being "summarily punished by anybody".

Gilbreath began by issuing an order to the civilian populace that nobody would be allowed to carry firearms except for hunting, and that places of drinking and gambling were to be closed by 10 P.M. on Saturday nights, and not open again until 6 A.M. the following Monday morning. To Gilbreath's surprise, the majority of the county fully obeyed. Within a month of Gilbreath's arrival, the county had become much more tame and orderly.

Gilbreath had more trouble selecting civil officers, as the position in the post-war era required that an applicant did not take part in the Confederate movement and was willing to take an oath of allegiance to the United States. Nobody, according to Gilbreath, was willing to take the oath, forcing Gilbreath to begin a rumor that he would select black freedmen for the offices. This immediately changed the minds of many who had previously declined to take the oath. Gilbreath later found out that since the creation of the county, many of the civil offices had been inherited through a family lineage, making many leery to take over what was viewed as a previously dynastic position, with other flat out opposing new members take the positions.

Gilbreath left Montgomery County in early 1870, as G Company of the 11th Infantry was transferred to Fort Griffin on the frontier. Gilbreath moved to the new post with his wife and two children, the youngest at that point being Etta Moore Gilbreath, who was born on March 9, 1870. During his posting at Fort Griffin, Gilbreath was assigned to the positions of post quartermaster and post commissary, and was put in charge of relations with the neighboring Tonkawa Indians. Gilbreath and his family left Fort Griffin in December 1872, by orders to report to New York City.

Upon arriving in New York, Gilbreath was detailed to Evansville, Indiana, where he and his family stayed for 15 months. In December 1873, Gilbreath was promoted to captain and granted a transfer request to Chicago. Gilbreath witnessed the Chicago Fire of 1874 and narrowly avoided having his own house burn down.

Gilbreath was transferred back to Texas in the fall of 1874. Setting off from Fort Concho, Gilbreath took command of Company H, 11th Infantry, which was stationed at a supply camp in Staked Plains, Texas. The duties at this supply camp were simply to supply troops and cowboys and guard the supplies from attack. Gilbreath personally headed supply trains between Fort Griffin and the camp. This carried on until early 1875 when Gilbreath received orders to return with his company to Fort Concho.

In 1875, Gilbreath was on sick leave in Baltimore. His wound from the Fredericksburg battle had become bothersome, and it was decided in Texas that an operation was necessary. As the surgeon at Fort Concho did not have the proper equipment, it was decided that Gilbreath should return east to have proper treatment. As Gilbreath was recovering, his third child, Erasmus Gilbreath, was born. Gilbreath received his surgery in Baltimore and, after a period of 10 months, returned to Fort Concho to take command of his company.

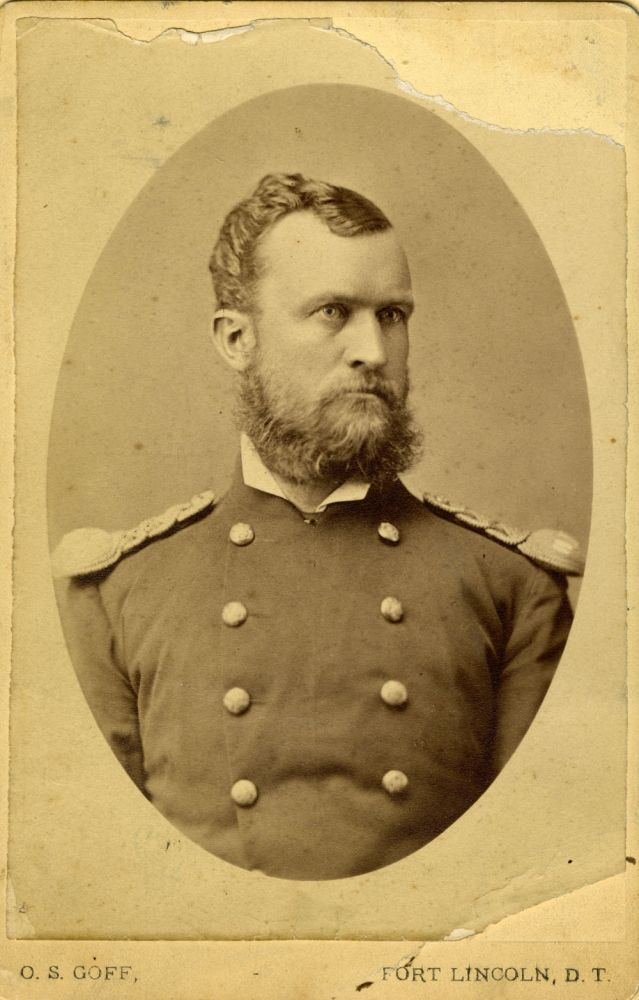
Erasmus Gilbreath at Fort Lincoln, 1870s

=== Service in the Dakotas ===
Following the Battle of Little Bighorn, Gilbreath and H Company were ordered to the Dakota territory on August 8, 1876. They made camp at Yankton, South Dakota to await the rest of the Regiment, which was now under the command of Lieutenant Colonel George Buell. H Company was detached to Fort Yates, where the Sioux tribe had become very active.

The 11th Infantry was moved from the Dakotas to Montana in order to build the post of Fort Custer. During the construction of the Fort, Gilbreath's fourth child, Nan Lott Gilbreath, was born in a tent at Terry's Landing. Having no doctor immediately available, Gilbreath employed the help of their cook. Shortly after her birth, Gilbreath built a large blockhouse to better protect the families and men of the regiment, as the Indians had become very aggressive in recent months.

Gilbreath remained posted at Fort Custer until 1888, when his regiment was recalled to New York.

=== Duties in Arizona ===
In 1891, the 11th Infantry was assigned to various postings in Arizona. The first posting was Huachuca, where Gilbreath performed various duties, including appearing as a witness at a court-martial. In March 1892, Gilbreath was ordered to take companies F and H to San Carlos, which at the time was the Apache Indian Agency. This posting lasted until July 1892, when Gilbreath was invited to take command of a recruiting post in Philadelphia.

Gilbreath remained in Philadelphia for two years, when he was relieved and ordered to Whipple Barracks, in Arizona.

== Spanish–American War ==
Following the opening of the Spanish–American War, the 11th Infantry was moved from its post in Mobile, Alabama, to Tampa, Florida in preparation for an invasion of Cuba. Around this time, Gilbreath got word from his wife in Philadelphia that his daughter Nan had been diagnosed with sepsis. Gilbreath had little hope for his daughter, as she had been suffering since February. Her health improved, and she went on to marry a Mr. Oliver Edwards.

During his journey to Florida, Gilbreath purchased a hammock for use in Cuba. However, upon using it shortly after he purchased it, one of the ropes broke. The impact was so great that Gilbreath said it "came near driving my spinal column clear out". The injury affected him throughout the month of June, as he notes it was difficult to continue drilling at points.

The 11th Infantry departed Florida on June 25 for Puerto Rico. On August 2, the regiment landed at Ponce, Puerto Rico. The regiment arrived in Mayagüez on August 11, with Gilbreath feeling very ill. Although Gilbreath felt better, he remained ill and died of apoplexy on August 22, 1898. His widow, Susan Corse Gilbreath, received a monthly pension of $25.

== Bibliography ==
- Dyer, Frederick H. (1908). A Compendium of the War of the Rebellion. Des Moines, IA: Dyer Pub. Co. ASIN B01BUFJ76Q.
- Houghton, Edwin B (1866). The Campaigns of the Seventeenth Maine. Portland, ME: Short & Loring. ISBN 978-0469474062..
