= Oliver P. Rood =

Medal of Honor recipient (1844–1885)

- Born: c. 1844; Kentucky, US
- Died: June 1, 1885 (aged 40-41); Nashville, Tennessee, US
- Burial place: Mount Olivet Cemetery, Nashville
- Military career
- Allegiance: United States
- Branch: Union Army
- Rank: Private
- Units: Company B, 20th Indiana Infantry; Company F, 14th Indiana Infantry
- Conflicts: Battle of Gettysburg; American Civil War
- Awards: Medal of Honor

Oliver Percy. Rood (c. 1844 – June 1, 1885) was an American soldier who fought with the Union Army in the American Civil War. Rood received his country's highest award for bravery during combat, the Medal of Honor, for actions taken on July 3, 1863, during the Battle of Gettysburg.

== Civil War service ==
Oliver Percy Rood was born in Kentucky, in 1844. He moved to Indiana in the mid-1850s. In 1860, Rood was an apprentice tinner living in Carlisle, Indiana. On August 27, 1862, Rood enlisted, at Terre Haute, as a private in Company F, 14th Regiment Indiana Infantry. When the 14th Regiment mustered out of service, Private Rood transferred to Company F, 20th Regiment Indiana Infantry.

While serving in the 14th Regiment, Private Rood fought at the Battle of Gettysburg under General Winfield Scott Hancock and witnessed his charge against General James Longstreet at Cemetery Hill.[4]

On the third day of the battle, Rood captured the flag of the 21st North Carolina Infantry Regiment, for which he was awarded the Medal of Honor in 1864. Rood was the only soldier from Indiana to receive the Medal of Honor during the Battle of Gettysburg.

== Medal of Honor citation ==
The President of the United States of America, in the name of Congress, takes pleasure in presenting the Medal of Honor to Private Oliver P. Rood, United States Army, for extraordinary heroism on 3 July 1863, while serving with Company B, 20th Indiana Infantry, in action at Gettysburg, Pennsylvania, for capture of flag of 21st North Carolina Infantry (Confederate States of America).
