= Gilbreth =

Gilbreth is a surname. Notable people with the surname include:

- Bill Gilbreth (1947–2020), American baseball player
- Ernestine Gilbreth Carey (1908–2006), American writer
- Frank Bunker Gilbreth, Jr. (1911–2001), American writer
- Frank Bunker Gilbreth, Sr. (1868–1924), American industrial engineer
- Lillian Moller Gilbreth (1878–1972), American psychologist and industrial engineer
- Robert Moller Gilbreth, American businessman, educator, and politician

== See also ==
- Gilbreth, Inc., early management consulting firm founded by Frank and Lillian Gilbreth
- Gilbreath
