= François Proth =

French mathematician

François Proth (22 March 1852 – 21 January 1879) was a self-taught French mathematician and farmer who lived in Vaux-devant-Damloup near Verdun, France.

He stated four primality-related theorems. The most famous of these, Proth's theorem, can be used to test whether a Proth number (a number of the form k × 2^{n} + 1 with k odd and k < 2^{n}) is prime. The numbers passing this test are called Proth primes; they continue to be of importance in the computational search for large prime numbers.

Proth also formulated Gilbreath's conjecture on successive differences of primes, 80 years prior to Gilbreath, but his proof of the conjecture turned out to be erroneous.

The cause of Proth's death is not known.

== Publications ==
- Proth, F. (1876), "Énoncés de divers théorèmes sur les nombres", Comptes rendus de l'Académie des Sciences de Paris, 83: 1288–1289.
- Proth, F. (1878), "Sur quelques identités", Nouvelle Correspondance Mathématique de M. E. Catalan, Bruxelles, 4: 377–378.
- Proth, F. (1878), "Théorème relatif à la théorie des nombres", Comptes rendus de l'Académie des Sciences de Paris, 87: 374.
- Proth, F. (1878), "Théorèmes sur les nombres premiers", Comptes rendus de l'Académie des Sciences de Paris, 87: 926.
