= Gordon Meade =

Gordon Meade (born 1957) is a poet.

== Biography ==
Gordon Meade studied English at the University of Dundee and Newcastle University. In 1993 he was appointed a creative writing fellow at Duncan of Jordanstone College of Art and Design in Dundee. He was also writer in residence for Dundee District Libraries.

Since 2000 he has led creative writing workshops for adults and vulnerable young children in drop-in centres and hospitals, as well as at universities in Germany, Belgium and Luxembourg. From 2008 to 2010 and 2011-2012 he was one of the Royal Literary Fund writing fellows at the University of Dundee.

Meade's latest work, Les Animots: A Human Bestiary, a book-length series of illustrated poems, was published in 2015.

== Works ==
- The Singing Seals (Chapman Publishing, 1991) ISBN 0906772338
- The Scrimshaw Sailor (Chapman Publishing, 1996) ISBN 0906772737
- A Man at Sea (Diehard Press, 2003) ISBN 0946230781
- The Cleaner Fish (Arrowhead Press, 2006) ISBN 1904852106
- The Private Zoo (Arrowhead Press, 2008) ISBN 1904852106
- The Familiar (Arrowhead Press, 2011) ISBN 1904852297
- Sounds of the Real World (Cultured Llama Publishing, 2013) ISBN 0992648505
- Les Animots: A Human Bestiary (Cultured Llama Publishing, 2015) ISBN 0992648599
- The Year of the Crab (Cultured Llama Publishing, 2017) ISBN 0995738130
- Zoospeak: Poems and Photography (Enthusiastic Press, 2020) ISBN 1916113044 - Photography by Jo-Anne McArthur.
- In TRANSIT (Enthusiastic Press, 2022)
- Ex-Posed: Animal Elegies (Lantern Books, 2023) ISBN 1590566769 - Photography by Jo-Anne McArthur.
