= Rose Woods =

Gettysburg Battlefield forested area

Rose Woods (Wible's Woods during the commemorative era)
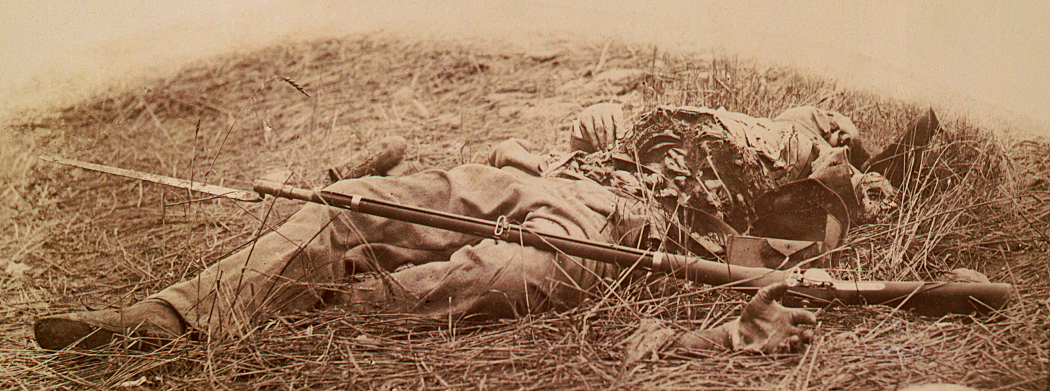
- Soldier killed by artillery fire on the southwestern edge of the Rose Woods, near the Wheatfield.
- Interactive map of Rose Woods

Geography
- Location: Gettysburg National Military Park, Adams County, Pennsylvania
- Coordinates: 39.7952°N 77.2439°W

Rose Woods is a Gettysburg Battlefield forested area that is an American Civil War site of the battle's Hood's Assault, McLaws' Assault, and McCandless' Advance. "Scene of the first line of Union defenses" on the Battle of Gettysburg, Second Day; the 1st Texas Infantry and 3rd Arkansas Infantry Regiments attacked Ward's 2nd Brigade line in the woods. The last combat on the Battle of Gettysburg, Third Day, was "in the early evening. Colonel William McCandless's brigade of Pennsylvania Reserves advanced across the Wheatfield into Rose's Woods where they managed to inflict heavy losses on the 15th Georgia" which had failed to retreat to Warfield Ridge after Longstreet's Assault. Two days later Timothy H. O'Sullivan photographed corpses moved for burial to the edge of Rose Woods and which were subsequently reinterred in cemeteries.

De Trobriand Avenue and other Military Park roads provide access to the woods' battlefield monuments, and the woods' railbed for the 1894-1916 Gettysburg Electric Railway is a historic district contributing structure that is now a rail trail. Monuments in the woods include the 1890 Sixty-fourth New York Regiment Monument, and Wheat-field Park in "Wible's Grove" was a commemorative era trolley park. The trolley's overhead power line broke at Wible's Woods in 1900, and the woods had the postbellum "William Wible's Quarry" for Gettysburg Granite (cf. Rosensteel's Quarry north of the Round Top Museum). In 2004, the archeological remains of the former trolley bridge in Rose Woods were named a historic district contributing structure.

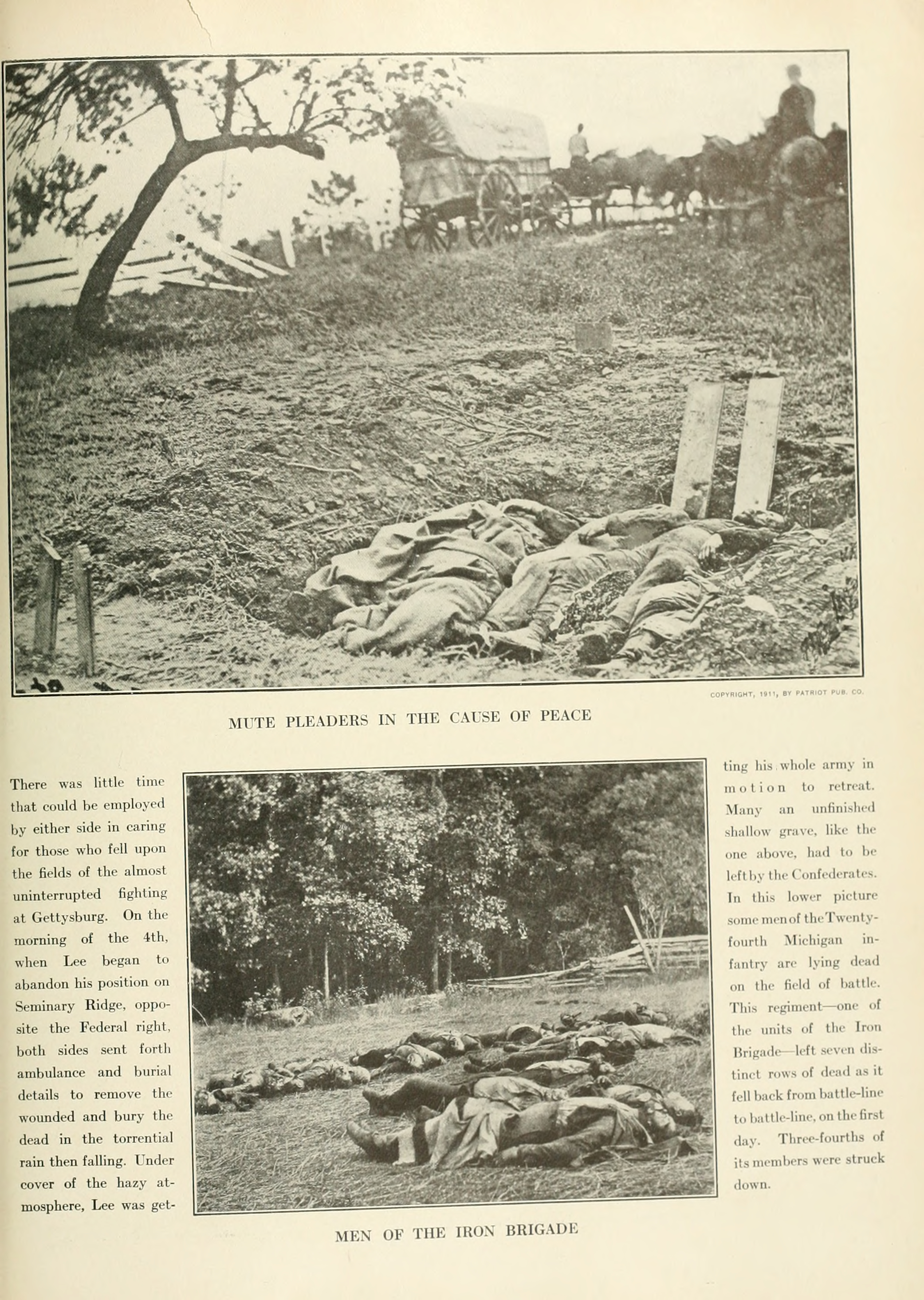
[Top] Confederate Dead at the Rose Farm near the Rose Woods[Bottom]Confederate Dead at the Rose Woods

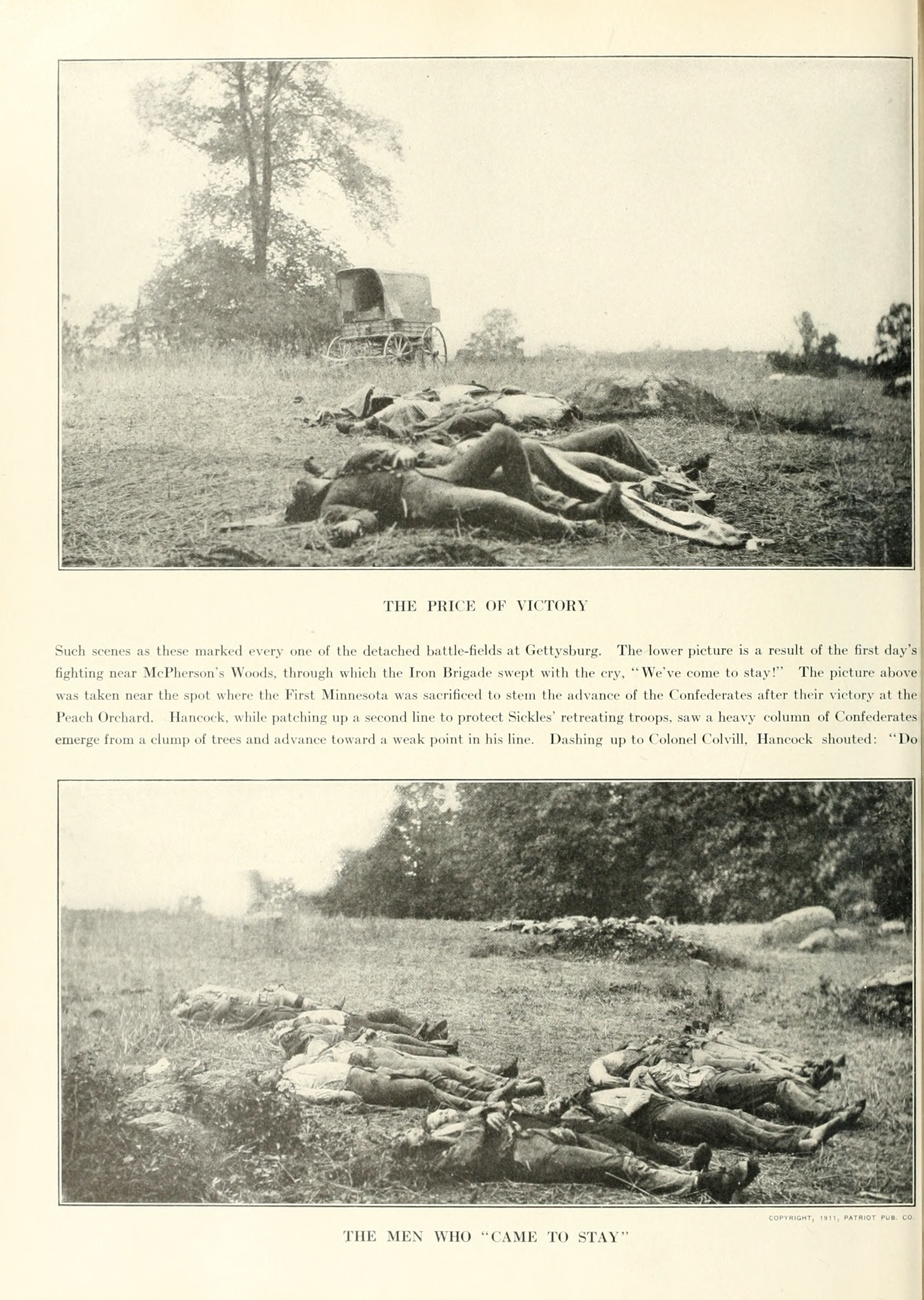
Confederate Dead at the Rose Woods

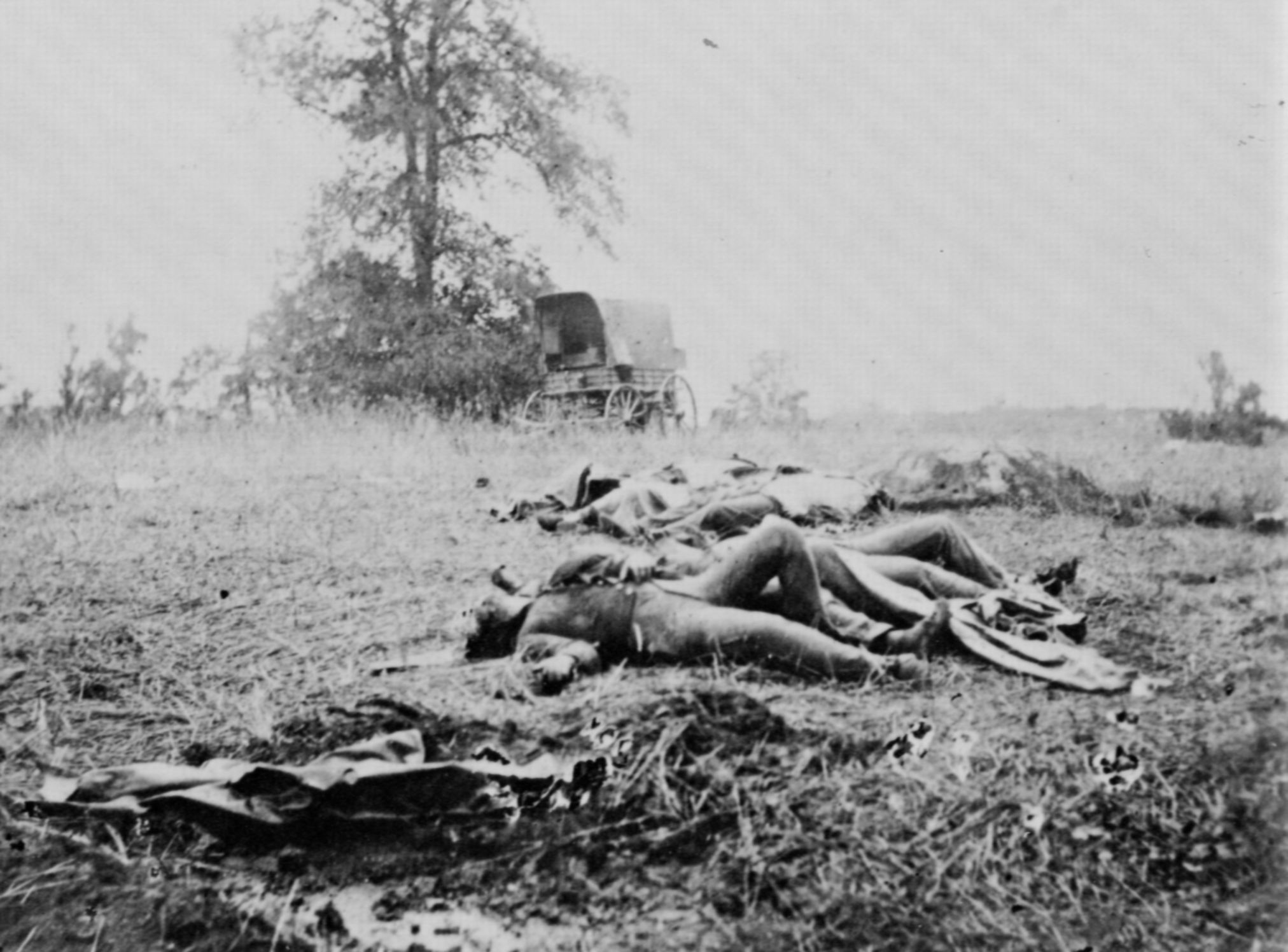
Confederate Dead at the Rose Woods somestimes misidentied as dead of the 1st Minnesota Regiment Union army

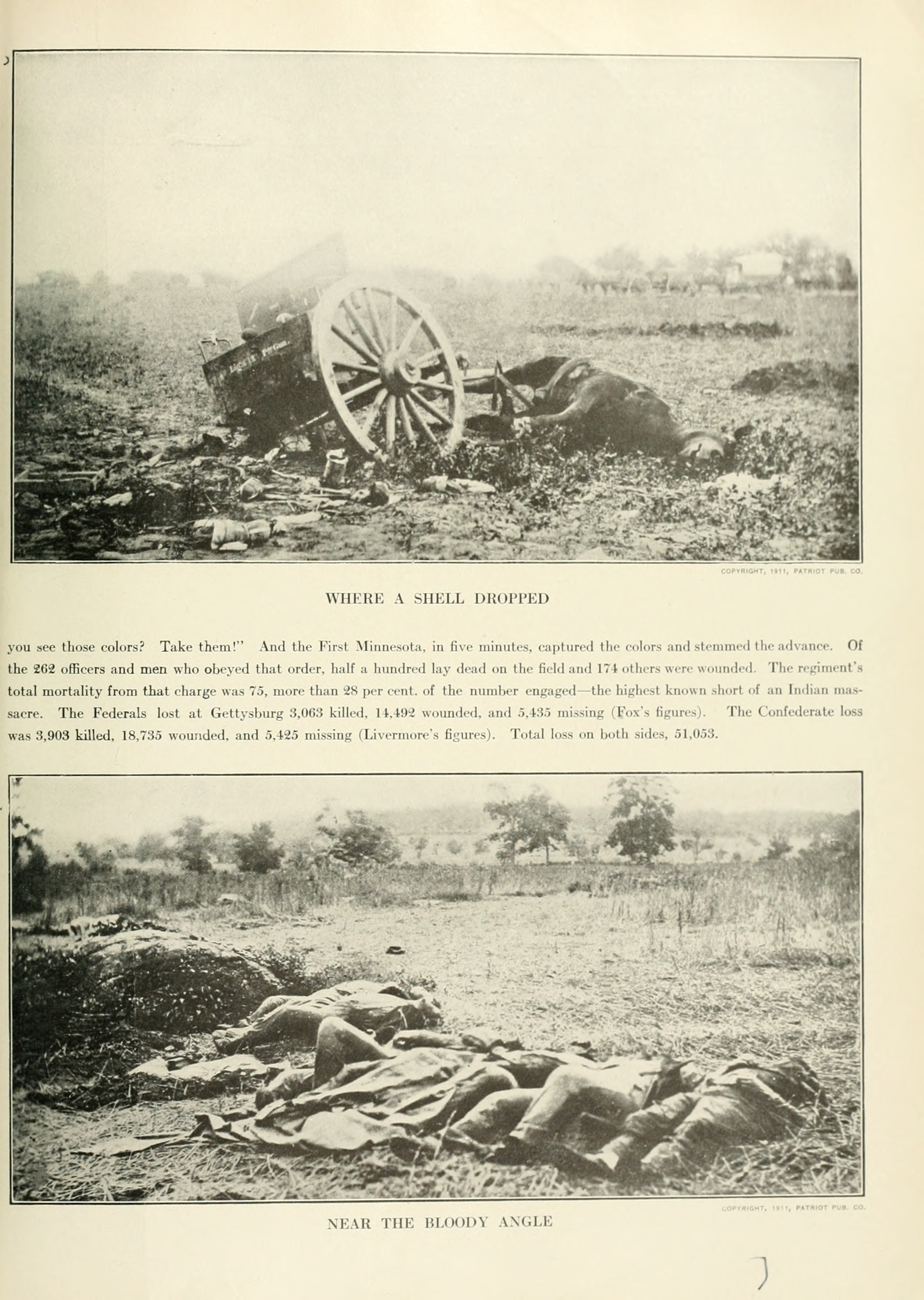
[Top]Dead horse at Trostle Farm[Bottom]Confederate Dead at the Rose Woods

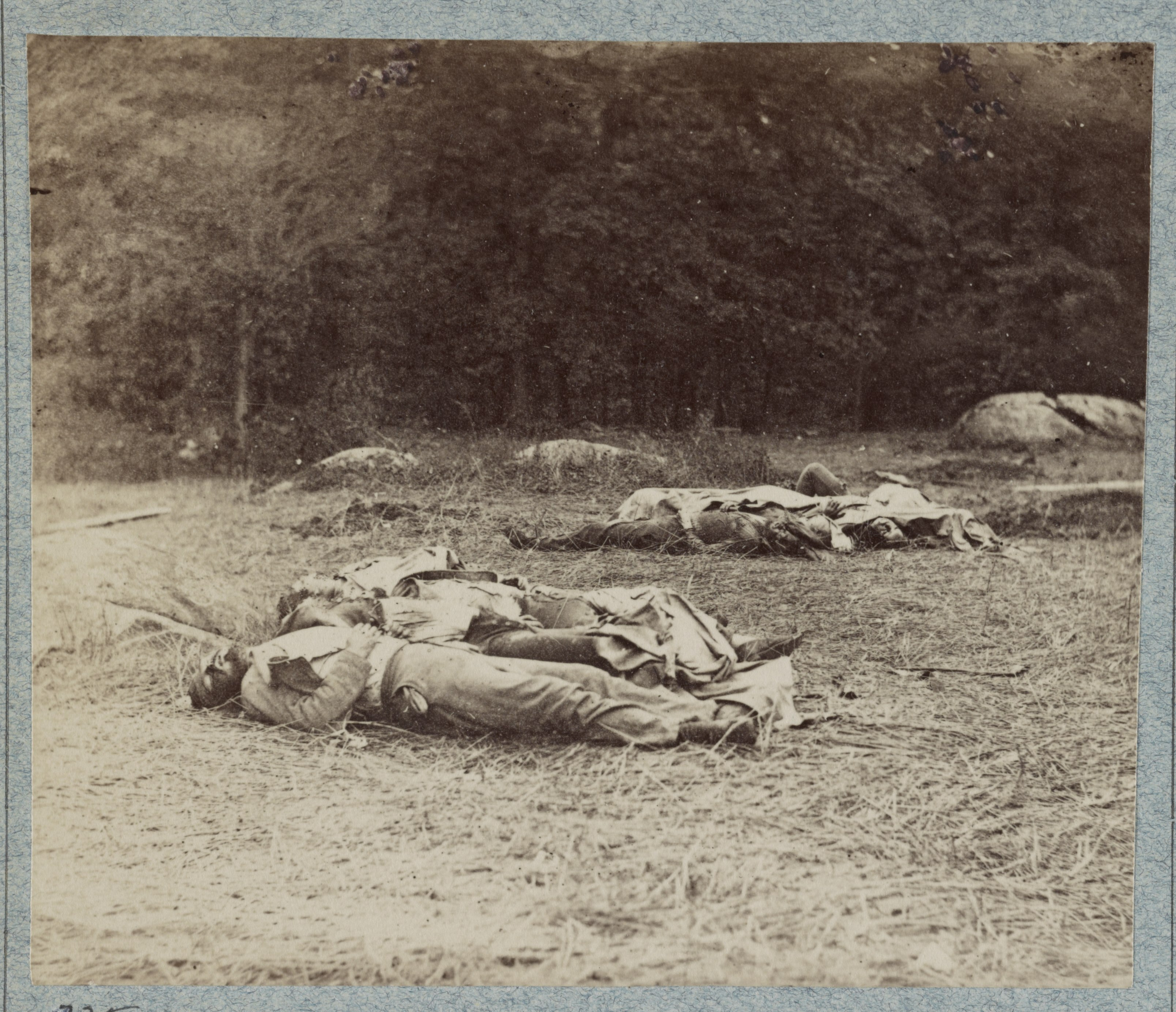
Confederate Dead at the Rose Woods

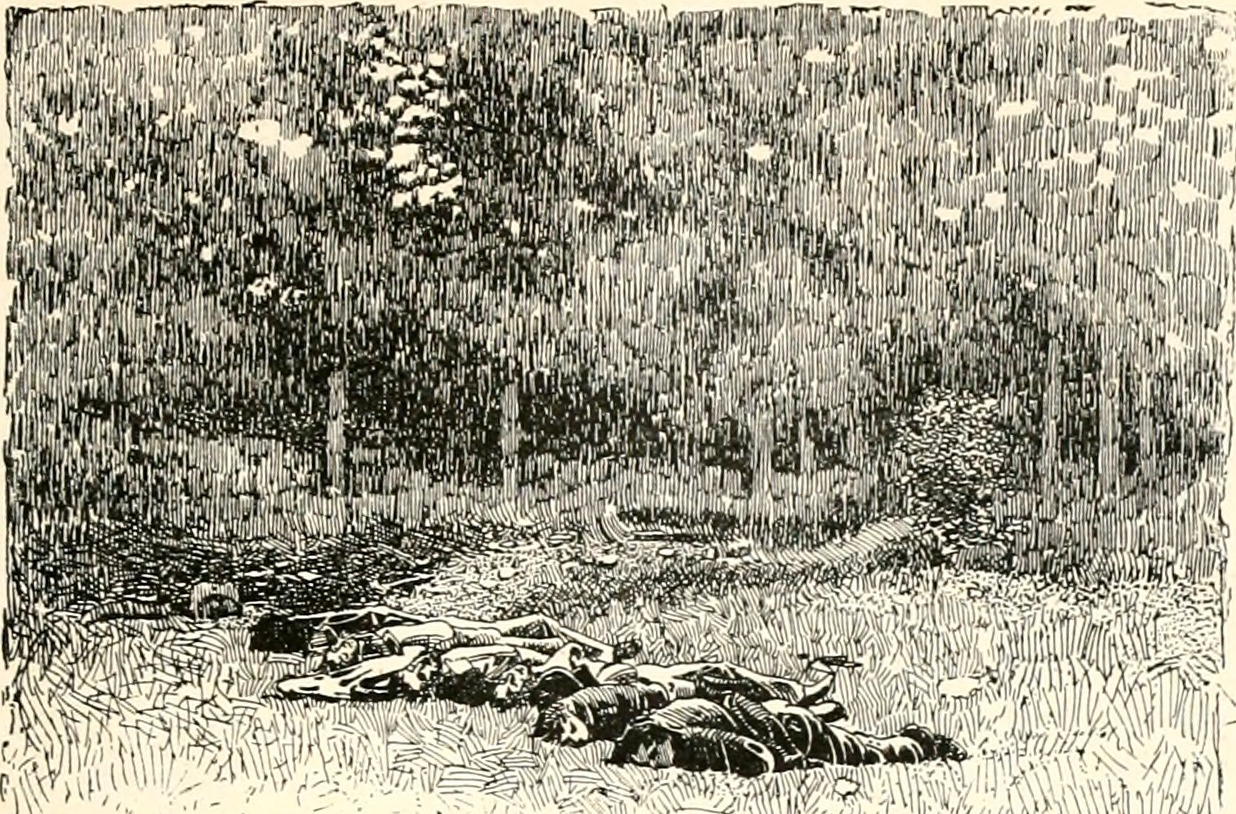
Confederate Dead at the Rose Woods
