= Gilbreath's conjecture =

Conjecture in number theory

Gilbreath's conjecture is a conjecture in number theory regarding the sequences generated by applying the forward difference operator to consecutive prime numbers and leaving the results unsigned, and then repeating this process on consecutive terms in the resulting sequence, and so forth. The statement is named after Norman L. Gilbreath who, in 1958, presented it to the mathematical community after observing the pattern by chance while doing arithmetic on a napkin. In 1878, eighty years before Gilbreath's discovery, François Proth had published the same observations.

== Motivating arithmetic ==
Consider the prime numbers

$$2, 3, 5, 7, 11, 13, 17, 19, 23, 29, 31, \dots$$

Computing the absolute value of the difference between term $n$ and term $n+1$ in this sequence yields the sequence

$$1, 2, 2, 4, 2, 4, 2, 4, 6, 2, \dots$$

If the same calculation is done for the terms in this new sequence, and the sequence that is the outcome of this process, and again ad infinitum for each sequence that is the output of such a calculation, the following five sequences in this list are

$$1, 0, 2, 2, 2, 2, 2, 2, 4, \dots$$
$$1, 2, 0, 0, 0, 0, 0, 2, \dots$$
$$1, 2, 0, 0, 0, 0, 2, \dots$$
$$1, 2, 0, 0, 0, 2, \dots$$
$$1, 2, 0, 0, 2, \dots$$

What Gilbreath—and Proth before him—noticed is that the first term in each series of differences appears to be 1.

== The conjecture ==
Formally, let $(p_n)$ denote the sequence of prime numbers. We can define the sequence $(d^k_n)$ recursively by

$$d_n^k = \begin{cases} p_{n+1} - p_n, & k = 1 \\[5pt] |d_{n+1}^{k-1} - d_n^{k-1}|, & k \geq 1. \end{cases}$$

Gilbreath's conjecture states that $d_1^k =1$ for all $k\geq 1$.

== Verification and attempted proofs ==
Several sources write that, as well as observing the pattern of Gilbreath's conjecture, Proth released what he believed to be a proof of the statement that was later shown to be flawed. However, Zachary Chase disputes this, writing that although Proth called the observation a "theorem", there is no evidence that he published a proof, or even a false proof, of it.

In 1993, Andrew Odlyzko verified that $d_1^k$ is equal to 1 for $k \leq n = 3.4 \times 10^{11}.$ Instead of evaluating $n$ rows, Odlyzko evaluated 635 rows and established that the 635th row started with a 1 and continued with only 0s and 2s for the next $n$ numbers. This implies that the next $n$ rows begin with a 1.

In 2025, Simon Plouffe announced a computational verification for the primes up to 10^{14}. That same year, Jean-Francois Colonna verified up to 2×10^{14}, and in 2026 up to 1.5×10^{15}. The conjecture remains an open problem.

== Generalizations ==
In 1980, Martin Gardner published a conjecture by Hallard Croft that stated that the property of Gilbreath's conjecture (having a 1 in the first term of each difference sequence) should hold more generally for every sequence that begins with 2, subsequently contains only odd numbers, and has a sufficiently low bound on the gaps between consecutive elements in the sequence. This conjecture has also been repeated by later authors. However, it is false: for every initial subsequence of 2 and odd numbers, and every non-constant growth rate, there is a continuation of the subsequence by odd numbers whose gaps obey the growth rate but whose difference sequences fail to begin with 1 infinitely often.

Odlyzko (1993) is more careful, writing of certain heuristic reasons for believing Gilbreath's conjecture that "the arguments above apply to many other sequences in which the first element is a 1, the others even, and where the gaps between consecutive elements are not too large and are sufficiently random." However, he does not give a formal definition of what "sufficiently random" means. Chase (2024) proves an analogue of the conjecture for sequences that begin with 2 and 3 (like the primes) and subsequently have gaps between successive elements $a_i-a_{i-1}$ that are drawn uniformly at random from the even integers in the interval $[0,f(i)]$, for functions $f$ that grow sufficiently slowly (significantly more slowly than the gaps between primes).

== See also ==
- Difference operator
- Prime gap
- Rule 90, a cellular automaton that controls the behavior of the parts of the rows that contain only the values 0 and 2
