= List of Sweet Valley High episodes =

This is a list of episodes in the Sweet Valley High television series, which starred real-life twins Brittany and Cynthia Daniel as twin sisters Jessica and Elizabeth Wakefield respectively. The seasons aired from 1994 through 1997.

== Series overview ==
Season	Episodes	Originally released	
Season	Episodes	First released	Last released
1	22	September 5, 1994	February 20, 1995
2	22	September 11, 1995	March 25, 1996
3	22	August 26, 1996	February 10, 1997
4	22	September 15, 1997	October 14, 1997

== Episodes ==
=== Season 1 (1994–95) ===
The 22 episode first season of Sweet Valley High debuted in syndication on September 5, 1994, and ended on February 20, 1995. A DVD of the first season was released on March 8, 2005; it is the only season released on DVD to date.

No. overall	No. in season	Title	Directed by	Written by	Original release date
1	1	"Dangerous Love"	Harvey Frost	Story by : Josh Goldstein & Jonathan Prince; Teleplay by : Josh Goldstein	September 5, 1994
Hijinks ensue when Elizabeth and Jessica are both nominated for Homecoming Queen. When Elizabeth wins, there are hard feelings and manipulation is plotted. Liz is not especially grateful to Todd for nominating her. Note: Scott Daniels, the college freshman in this episode, was taken from book five of the series, "All Night Long", while the ending pool sequence was based on a similar event in book one, "Double Love".
2	2	"Oracle on Air"	Harvey Frost	Raul Fernandez	September 12, 1994
Elizabeth and Jessica compete for the role of presenter on the in-school news program. Jessica wins, but it's discovered that she cheated. Jess then asks Liz for help. Winston wants to get even with Bruce for all the pranks he keeps playing on him.
3	3	"Skin and Bones"	Harvey Frost	Lanny Horn	September 19, 1994
Jessica poses for famous artist Dakota Dancer and is horrified when he paints her nude.
4	4	"Critical Mess"	Harvey Frost	David Saling & Sheldon Krasner	September 26, 1994
When Jessica hears through the grapevine that Bruce's uncle, a Hollywood director, is in town, she is determined to get a role in his movie. Jessica's ecstatic to get Elizabeth to review her appearing in "MacBeth"... until she reads the review. Note: The Red Ranger from Mighty Morphin Power Rangers makes an appearance in this episode.
5	5	"What, Me Study?"	Douglas Barr	Denitria Trinise Harris	October 3, 1994
Jessica accesses Mr Russo's computer to gain a copy of the chemistry quiz, even to the point of manipulating Winston. But it's Winston who gets in trouble. Liz forgets the anniversary of her and Todd, but tries not to let him know it.
6	6	"Almost Married"	Harvey Frost	Eric Gethers	October 10, 1994
Todd moves into the Wakefield house when Liz's parents are out of town. It's like an intro to marriage. But is that what these two really need? Note: Based loosely on book 102 of the same name.
7	7	"The Curse of the Lawrence Mansion"	Marc Lawrence	Bruce Kalish	October 17, 1994
The gang spend Halloween at school, where they attempt to revive a student who died 25 years ago. A lot of strange, creepy happenings are going on. Is this just "tricking" on the night of "Trick or Treat?" Or is something more dire really going on?
8	8	"The Prince of Santa Dora"	Harvey Frost	Ellen Ratner & Alison Dale	October 24, 1994
Elizabeth's pen-pal, Prince Arthur Castillio, visits Sweet Valley and falls in love with Jessica. Lila finds out a rather ugly secret about the Prince. Note: Based on book 91, "In Love With a Prince" and Sweet Valley Twins book 30, "Princess Elizabeth".
9	9	"Coma"	Harvey Frost	Dawn Ritchie	October 31, 1994
Elizabeth falls into a coma after an accident on Todd's motorcycle. After she wakes up, she becomes someone else entirely: Jessica. Actually, more Jessica than Jessica. Note: Based on books six and seven, "Dangerous Love" and "Dear Sister".
10	10	"Uh Oh Seven"	Douglas Barr	Dawn Ritchie	November 7, 1994
Liz writes a spy novel after watching a James Bond movie starring herself and featuring all her friends. She decides women don't have enough of an active role in the adventure genre, so she makes the females the stars and the males secondary.
11	11	"Secrets"	Douglas Barr	Dawn Ritchie	November 14, 1994
When Enid's new boyfriend Ronnie asks her to be spokesperson for an anti-drugs campaign, she is terrified he will discover her own history with drugs. Jessica wants the job for herself and is more than willing to resort to her own trademark tricks to get such a spot. Note: Based on book two, "Secrets".
12	12	"Photographic Evidence"	Harvey Frost	Matthew Odgers & David Markus	November 21, 1994
Liz takes a photo of three suspicious men on the beach, one of whom turns out to be a witness wanted by police. Jessica herself falls for one of the perpetrators. Note: based on book 72, "Regina's Legacy".
13	13	"Club X"	Gil Bettman	Raul Fernandez	November 28, 1994
Jessica takes drastic measures when she joins Bruce Patman's daredevil club. Todd is making money hustling people at basketball--so much that he loses interest in Liz and Winston. Note: Based on SVH Book 86, "Jessica Against Bruce" Kurt Rambis guest stars as himself who returns Elizabeth's charity.
14	14	"Poetic Injustice"	Richard Wenk	Matthew Odgers & David Markus	December 5, 1994
Jessica falls for the school's poetry teacher. So much in fact, she actually takes an interest in poetry. She even plagiarizes one of Elizabeth's poems to impress her teacher. But when she plagiarizes one of his, what will he think of her now?
15	15	"Stolen Diary"	Robert Radler	Raul Fernandez	December 12, 1994
Jessica manipulates Peggy into breaking up Liz and Todd by having Peggy throw herself at him. A scorned date steals Liz's diary and spread her secrets around the school. This episode marks the first of seven appearances of newcomer, Koichi Yamasaki, played by Michael K. Hayashida. Note: Based on book 84 of the same name.
16	16	"Love On The Line"	Douglas Barr	Raul Fernandez	January 2, 1995
Enid and Jessica pull a Cyrano de Bergerac when Enid is too shy to meet a quarterback with whom she has been corresponding with. But when Jessica sees what a catch he is, she snakes him all for herself. Can Liz show this guy what Jess is really like? Note: Based loosely on book 87, "My Best Friend's Boyfriend".
17	17	"Working Girl"	Joel Bender	Kayla Alpert & Marc Hyman	January 9, 1995
Lila's father forces her to work at the Moon Beach cafe, where she falls for delivery man Heath. She pretends to be working-class to start a relationship with him.
18	18	"Dancin' Fools"	Douglas Barr	Marc Hyman & Kayla Alpert	January 23, 1995
Jessica and Lila compete in the Pacific Freestyle Dance.
19	19	"Kidnapped, Part 1"	Harvey Frost	David Garber	January 30, 1995
Elizabeth and Jessica volunteer as candy stripers at the local hospital, where they meet television host, Jeremy Frakes. Winston may have a crush on Elizabeth. There's a hospital employee who's very disturbed, but Elizabeth befriends him. Unfortunately, it turns out to be a big mistake. Note: Based loosely on book 12, "When Love Dies".
20	20	"Kidnapped, Part 2"	Harvey Frost	David Garber	February 6, 1995
Elizabeth is kidnapped and Winston is a suspect. Everyone turns on him, including his best friend. Note: Based on book 13 "Kidnapped!".
21	21	"Kidnapped, Part 3"	David Garber	David Garber	February 13, 1995
Elizabeth and Jessica are placed under protective custody when Peter escapes from jail. This time, Peter kidnaps Jessica.
22	22	"Say Goodbye"	Douglas Barr	Cheryl Saban	February 20, 1995
Todd is accepted into a prestigious sports academy - in Vermont. Does this mean the end of him and Liz forever? Note: Based on book 23 of the same name and book 14, "Deceptions".

=== Season 2 (1995–96) ===
The second season of Sweet Valley High debuted in syndication on September 11, 1995 and ended on March 25, 1996. The show also saw two changes to the cast with the departures of Amarilis who played Patty Gilbert and Brock Burnett who played Bruce Patman respectively. The new series regulars that joined the show were Christopher Jackson took over the role of Patman and Tyffany Hayes who played new character Cheryl "Tatyana" Thomas. There were 22 episodes.

No. overall	No. in season	Title	Directed by	Written by	Original release date
23	1	"Summer Lovin'"	Douglas Barr	Kayla Alpert & Marc Hyman	September 11, 1995
Liz is thrilled when Todd returns to Sweet Valley - until she discovers he was kicked off the team. His sweet disposition has turned into sour depression and he's not especially interested in getting back together with Liz.
24	2	"Model Behavior"	Harvey Frost	Jordan Budde	September 18, 1995
Famous model Tatyana Thomas comes to Sweet Valley, hoping for a fresh start. But everyone seems more interested in being a fan than a friend. Except for Todd, who she warms up to. But what is really going on between them? Note: Cheryl (Tatyana) Thomas is Annie Whitman's stepsister in the book series.
25	3	"Promotional Rescue"	Harvey Frost	David Litt	September 25, 1995
Bruce and Jessica are left in charge of the Moon Beach; Liz, Enid and Cheryl go on a girls camping trip. Liz does what she can to forget about Todd.
26	4	"Dark Side of the Moon"	Harvey Frost	David Saling & Sheldon Krasner	October 2, 1995
Winston finds out Todd is running with a gang; Liz starts dating again.
27	5	"IQ Commeth"	Brian Thomas Jones	David Litt	October 9, 1995
Jessica - and everyone else at Sweet Valley High - is shocked when she receives the highest score on the college compatibility test. Todd's new friends demand money from Winston--or else. Elizabeth takes Todd to task over his indifference and cruelty to Winston's plight, and Cheryl offers to teach him some boxing moves to defend himself.
28	6	"False Possessions"	Bradley Battersby	Jordan Budde	October 16, 1995
Enid tries to cheer Todd up about getting cut from the basketball team and the two start spending a lot of time together. Enid soon finds herself falling for Todd, much to the horror of Liz and Manny; Jessica and Lila are caught shoplifting. Loosely based on SVH #4's Power Play
29	7	"A Fair to Remember"	Joel Bender	David Saling & Sheldon Krasner	October 23, 1995
Todd's new friend, Jason, dates Liz and Jessica at the same time--among other girls at the school. Todd isn't sure whether to warn them or not as Jason is the new coach's nephew and saving them may cost him a spot on the team. However, Jessica sees Jason for who he is and is able to warn Liz about him before he ruins them both
30	8	"It's My Party and I'll Ditch It If I Want To"	Douglas Barr	Peggy Nicoll	October 30, 1995
Liz is upset to find out Jessica bows out of the annual Wakefield sleepover, preferring to attend dinner with Bruce and his Harvard friends.
31	9	"Blunder Alley"	Bradley Battersby	Peggy Nicoll	November 6, 1995
Todd and Liz go to the bowling alley each with dates. It looks like the night's set to be a disaster for both of them, but could this be an opportunity for the two of them as well? Bruce installs a fortune-telling booth at the Moon Beach, which only predicts bad luck to Jessica and Lila. However, Jessica ends up getting the last laugh when the booth is taken down and Bruce is exposed for his fraud.
32	10	"Like Water for Hot Dogs"	Judy Simon	Eleah Horwitz	November 13, 1995
Liz wonders if Todd will ask her out for their anniversary. He asks advice from Lila, but when Elizabeth sees them together she gets the wrong idea.
33	11	"The Quick and the Blond"	Bradley Battersby	Kayla Alpert & Marc Hyman	November 20, 1995
Liz discovers that Bruce's ancestor Bruno did not found Sweet Valley as he claims. And we see how the wild, wild west really was won.
34	12	"Mixed Doubles"	Bradley Battersby	Eleah Horwitz	November 27, 1995
When Bruce falls for the Brazilian exchange student, he and Jessica start dating to make her jealous; however, she develops she may be interested in him. But does he feel the same way?
35	13	"Reading, Writing, Rescue"	David Winning	Mark O'Keefe	December 4, 1995
Winston becomes Jessica's genie after she saves his life. Enid thinks everything is going well with David, but fears he is losing interest when he keeps standing her up.
36	14	"The War of the Pom Poms"	Brian Thomas Jones	Lance H. Robbins & Abbie Charette	December 11, 1995
New student Heather Malone is made cheerleading co-captain; Jessica quits in disgust and forms her own squad. Jessica asks Elizabeth to join. After finding evidence of an affair Elizabeth had with Todd’s best friend while he was in Vermont, Jessica has perfect ammunition to get her last squad member. Note: Based on the cheerleading mini-series, "Jessica Quits the Squad", "The Pom Pom Wars" and "V For Victory".
37	15	"You Call This a Wonderful Life"	Douglas Barr	Howard Nemetz	December 18, 1995
At Christmastime, an angel shows Elizabeth and Jessica how their friends lives would have turned out if the twins had never been born.
38	16	"Sam Enchanted Evening"	Douglas Barr	Perry Dance	January 1, 1996
Jessica meets Sam Woodruff at a motor-cross race. Sam has a rather ugly past and both Liz and Todd aren't sure if he can be trusted.
39	17	"Totally Clueless"	David Winning	Parker Bennett	January 8, 1996
Jessica and Lila try to win a pool contest held at the Moon Beach.
40	18	"Win Sam, Lose Sam"	Douglas Barr	Howard Nemetz	January 15, 1996
Lila is jealous of all the time that Jessica is spending with Sam.
41	19	"Identical Opposites"	Brian Thomas Jones	Kayla Alpert & Marc Hyman	January 22, 1996
Jessica and Elizabeth must pretend to be long lost twin sisters when they appear on the Foxie Jones Show. When the fame goes to Jessica's head, Elizabeth and Jessica switch places as they always do. Elizabeth has fun being Jessica, but can Jessica walk a mile in Elizabeth's shoes?
42	20	"One Big Mesa"	Douglas Barr	Perry Dance	January 29, 1996
A war of vandalism is abound in the lead up to the big Sweet Valley vs Big Mesa game. When Jessica draws first blood, there's inevitable retaliation. And when the Mesa school mascot is kidnapped, Winston is taken into custody also. All this may cost Todd his dream job. Note: Power Rangers actress Catherine Sutherland guests in this episode as Ginger, the Big Mesa's journalist and Jessica and Lila's rival.
43	21	"Sam Kind of Wonderful"	Brian Thomas Jones	Kayla Alpert & Marc Hyman	February 5, 1996
The school yearbook votes the students in a poll and many are unprepared to deal with the results, especially Elizabeth who's voted "Most Responsible"--much to her horror. Sam wins a sponsorship and the chance to race in Australia, but Jessica doesn't want him to leave Sweet Valley. But... does he?
44	22	"A Look Back in Anecdotes"	Douglas Barr	Howard Nemetz	March 25, 1996
Set in the future, talk show host Jessica and journalist Elizabeth return to Sweet Valley to sell their house, which leads to reminiscing about their time in Sweet Valley.

=== Season 3 (1996–97) ===
Sweet Valley High, Season Three debuted in syndication on August 26, 1996 and ended on February 10, 1997. There were 22 episodes. This is the first season where Jeremy Vincent Garrett and Shirlee Elliot are brought aboard to replace Ryan Bittle and Bridget Flanery in the roles of Todd Wilkins and Lila Fowler. John Jocelyn also joined the cast as Reginald "Shred" Patman after the departure of Christopher Jackson who took over the role of Bruce Patman in the previous season. At this point, the characters were titled mostly in the direction of dumb comic-relief. This season is also notable for a very special guest-starring role that was filled by Jason David Frank who was best known for his roles in the Power Rangers film and television series.

No. overall	No. in season	Title	Directed by	Written by	Original release date
45	1	"Much Ado About Nachos"	David Winning	Mark LaVine & Eddie Ring	August 26, 1996
The gang holidays in Mexico. They're all at a Mexican resort paid for by the Fowler family and Enid finally learns Manny's true feelings for her. Lila and Jessica run up such a huge tab, they find out that Lila has been cut off. How are they going to pay the piper?
46	2	"Shred Reckoning"	David Winning	Peggy Nicoll & Barry Stringfellow	September 2, 1996
Bruce joins the army and his cousin arrives in Sweet Valley. But he's a far cry from Bruce.
47	3	"Imperfectly Fit"	David Winning	Melissa Clark & Lesley Wolff	September 9, 1996
Liz takes a job at The Tribune and develops feelings for a co-worker who tries to talk her into leaving Todd for him; Jessica and Lila are desperate to be a part of the fitness video that Cheryl is hosting.
48	4	"The Man of My Screams"	Bradley Battersby	Peter Egan	September 16, 1996
Todd suspects that Elizabeth likes co-worker Peter and has Manny and Winston spy on her. Todd then attempts to share Elizabeth's own interests, but he just can't get into it. Jessica has romantic feelings about Shred that just won't go away.
49	5	"Are You a Man or a Mouse?"	Bradley Battersby	Mark LaVine & Eddie Ring	September 23, 1996
Liz breaks up with Todd to pursue a relationship with Peter while trying to catch a hamster running loose in the house. Manny and Winston help Todd get through the break-up.
50	6	"The Mondo Chill"	David Winning	Melissa Clark & Lesley Wolff	September 30, 1996
Elizabeth and Peter spend their first date at home, caring for a sick Jessica--much to their dismay.
51	7	"Surfing the Nets"	Douglas Barr	Peggy Nicoll & Barry Stringfellow	October 7, 1996
The group make a bet to see who can give up their bad habit (no flirting for Jess, no sports talk for Todd, etc) for 48 hours.
52	8	"Mall Brats"	Douglas Barr	Peter Egan	October 14, 1996
Jess and Lila take jobs at the mall. Jessica and Lila want to model, but Lila’s credit cards don't work anymore. She's been cut off by her father. The pair must find jobs in the mall in order to receive discounts on the dresses. Elizabeth and Peter break up after Peter shows he's more interested in succeeding at the paper than being a boyfriend to her. Elizabeth realizes she's make a huge mistake.
53	9	"Swish Upon a Star"	Steve Markowitz	Peter Egan	October 21, 1996
Elizabeth is sick of Jessica's selfishness. After Todd's scores the winning points at a game, his fame grow as much as his ego. When a party is thrown for Enid, Jessica and Todd both show how much they care.
54	10	"The Tooth Hurts"	Bradley Battersby	Mark LaVine & Eddie Ring	October 28, 1996
Todd is on top of the world and everyone wants a piece of him, including Jessica. Todd asks Liz for help with his televised Headline America interview. Liz is still harboring feelings for Todd and the hopes that they'll get back together. She finds herself falling back in love with him. During his interview, he makes his feelings and interest in her shockingly and publicly clear.
55	11	"Rock Around the Block"	Susan Rohrer	Mark LaVine & Eddie Ring	November 4, 1996
There's a band next door to the Wakefields that is loud and causing Liz and Jess to lose sleep. But when Jess goes over to complain, she finds herself falling for the lead singer. Todd, the basketball team and the entire school suffer for him illegally accepting payola. And then everyone turns on Todd, especially Liz. Note: Based on a Sweet Valley University plot. Power Rangers actor Jason David Frank guests in this episodes and the next three as AJ and he appears in the opening credits.
56	12	"Lofty Ambitions"	Steve Markowitz	Melissa Clark & Lesley Wolff	November 11, 1996
Employees of one of the Moon Beach's competitors play practical jokes on Winston. Jessica continues to see AJ, a musician.
57	13	"Shakes, Fries and Videotape"	Bradley Battersby	Peter Egan	November 18, 1996
Winston creates a commercial for the Moon Beach and asks Liz to star. And his commercials is nothing short of humiliating. AJ's band mates force him to choose between Jessica and the band.
58	14	"A Star is Torn"	Steve Markovitz	Melissa Clark & Lesley Wolff	November 25, 1996
AJ's band gets their big break after Jessica gives their demo tape to a DJ. But the big break may mean a break-up for her and AJ.
59	15	"Ready, Set, Snow!"	Susan Rohrer	Barry Stringfellow & Peggy Nicoll	December 2, 1996
Elizabeth has to do all the Christmas charity herself while everyone else gets to go have fun. Jessica and Lila's Scrooge-like behavior at Christmas sees them visited by the ghosts of Christmas past, present and future.
60	16	"Don't Stand So Close to Me"	Stuart Taylor	Peter Egan	December 2, 1996
Todd starts seeing Carrie after learning that Liz has a new boyfriend. But Liz's boyfriend is more interested in his car than her or anything else. Todd and Carrie go on a nature hike but when Todd gets lost, he calls Liz to come and help him. Jessica is convinced she has psychic powers after seeing a commercial.
61	17	"All Along in the Water Tower"	Steve Markovitz	Unknown	December 16, 1996
Liz is swamped with dates after her comments are heard over the intercom. One of her comments is she's still interested in Todd. Winston encourages Todd to go after Liz, but is it a good idea? Jessica dates Brad (Jensen Ackles), who turns out to be Enid's cousin.
62	18	"My Fair Shred"	Bradley Battersby	Jennifer Heftler & Lisa Page Kissig	January 6, 1997
Shred is faced with military school and asks Lila and Jessica to teach him etiquette. Liz and Todd want to spice up their dull routine, but fight when they have very different ideas about what passes for "romance." Winston arranges a huge sign for The Moon Beach, but it blacks out the entire town.
63	19	"Sweet Valley Fever"	Susan Rohrer	Peter Egan	January 13, 1997
Jessica plans a '70's disco dance at Sweet Valley after Enid gives her the idea. Liz wants Todd to get into the spirit of the decade, but Todd doesn't really want to. Until the principal shows him the light.
64	20	"Crimes and Cappuccinos"	Susan Rohrer	Troy Schmidt	January 20, 1997
Jessica spends time with Enid after Lila disappears. But as Enid and Jessica get closer, Enid and Liz grow further apart. Lila drives her kidnappers crazy. A cappuccino machine left at The Moon Beach turns the place into the ultimate hot spot.
65	21	"Search for Liz"	Bradley Battersby	Peggy Nicoll & Barry Stringfellow	January 27, 1997
After hitting her head on a door, Jessica dreams she and her friends are characters in a soap opera.
66	22	"Might as Well Jump"	Steve Markowitz	Barry Stringfellow & Peggy Nicoll	February 10, 1997
Jessica's plans of a European summer are threatened when she fails her social studies test. The basketball team wants to partake in their yearly tradition of jumping off Jackson’s Bluff. Todd isn't sure he wants to go, but Liz doesn't want him to at all. When Winston also feels like he has something to prove, everything comes to a head.

=== Season 4 (1997) ===
Sweet Valley High, Season Four was the final season for the show and the first and only season to be aired on a network. It debuted on UPN on September 15, 1997 and ended on October 14, 1997. There were 22 episodes. No official finale was filmed, as it was believed that the series would be picked up for a fifth season. The two final additions to the cast as season regulars were Andrea Savage who played Renata Vargas and Manley Pope who portrayed Devon Whitelaw. Manley Pope originally appeared as a recurring bullying character in Season 2.

No. overall	No. in season	Title	Directed by	Written by	Original release date
67	1	"Romance Wasn't Built in a Day"	Steve Markowitz	Paul A. Kaplan & Joanne Fink	September 15, 1997
Enid's wins a trip to Brazil for her and her friends. Todd wants to go all the way with Elizabeth right there in paradise, among other adult things. But Enid starts to feel lonely as everyone else would rather do something without her, including Manny. Jessica and Lila spot the handsome Ricardo and are very interested. But they find out he's there to meet Renata instead.
68	2	"Loose Lips Sink Yachts"	Steve Markowitz	Leslie Rieder	September 16, 1997
Devon Whitelaw's arrival in Sweet Valley causes a stir. Jessica and Renata battle it out for him. Elizabeth finds out that his parents died under mysterious circumstances and Devon himself may be responsible. Note: Based loosely on book 138 "What Jessica Wants".
69	3	"Drag King"	Stuart Taylor	Paul A. Kaplan & Joanne Fink	September 17, 1997
Jessica uses a love potion to attract Devon. Renata tries to fit in and Winston tries to help her do so--and hopefully become her boyfriend at the same time. Devon challenges Todd to a drag race. Devon makes it clear who he's really interested in.
70	4	"The Right to Bare Midriffs"	Stuart Taylor	Christopher Briggs & Peter Knight	September 18, 1997
Todd and Winston are involved in a case of Internet mistaken identity as Winston's on-line girlfriend mistakes him for Todd and is ecstatic. Elizabeth however, is not. Jessica, Lila and Renata protest the new dress code.
71	5	"Lights, Camera, Fractions"	Steve Markowitz	Christopher Briggs & Peter Knight	September 19, 1997
Jessica stars in Winston's student film--and ultimately ruins it (with help from Todd). Devon tries to help Elizabeth lighten up.
72	6	"A Kiss is Just a Kiss"	Susan Rohrer	Leslie Rieder	September 22, 1997
Jessica thinks that Devon is the perfect guy, but he only has eyes for her twin sister. Everything comes to a head when Devon kisses Liz. Liz finds herself feeling something for Devon. Renata has her eye on Todd and tries to insinuate her way into his life and heart as well.
73	7	"The Kiss Heard Around the School"	Stuart Taylor	Paul A. Kaplan & Joanne Fink	September 23, 1997
When Renata hears Devon has kissed Liz, she kisses Todd--and tells him (and everyone else) about the kiss between Liz and Devon. Todd punches Devon and is later suspended for his actions. And tired of the drama with Elizabeth, Todd starts making time with Renata. Jessica tries ways to make Devon notice her, but it's all in vain. Devon makes it clear that he's not interested in her, but Liz. Note: Based on book 139 and 1940, "Elizabeth is Mine" and "Please Forgive Me".
74	8	"Lucky Streaks"	Stuart Taylor	Christopher Briggs & Peter Knight	September 24, 1997
Jessica is devastated when Liz and Devon start dating, but it proves to be the least of her problems. Having made the mistake in taking Lila's suggestion to get cheap low-lights, Jessica is left with strands of electric green streak and seeks Cheryl's help. At first, both Liz and Todd are happy to be with other people. But then problems arise when Devon doesn't want to be around Liz's friends or let Liz pick their activities and Renata wants to dress Todd her way. Devon and Renata both prove to be extremely high-maintenance, causing Liz and Todd to chafe under it. After getting her hair fixed, Jessica overhears Devon's conversation and learns his plans to make Liz end her friendship with Enid so they can be alone. She realizes how selfish he is and stops pursuing him. Jessica tells Liz about Devon's plans and warns her to end her relationship with him right away. Angered by this, Liz immediately confronts Devon for it and unless he changes his ways, she will break up with him. To keep her, Devon agrees to be more open minded in letting her pick their activities and spend time with her friends.
75	9	"West Coast Story: Part 1"	Steve Markowitz	Peggy Nicoll & Barry Stringfellow	September 25, 1997
The practical joking starts up again in the lead up to the Big Mesa game. And the joking leads to serious all-out war. Renata joins the cheer-leading squad to support Todd, much to everyone's dismay--especially Todd's. Liz and Devon continues having problems in their relationship. Jessica find a new love interest in the form of her surfing instructor, Christian Gorman, who is a Big Mesa student. Note: Based on book 120, "In Love With the Enemy", although Christian Gorman attended Palisades in the book.
76	10	"West Coast Story: Part 2"	Steve Markowitz	Peggy Nicoll & Barry Stringfellow	September 26, 1997
A fight is scheduled between Sweet Valley and Big Mesa High. Jessica's popularity dips further when her classmates find out about her relationship with Christian. Mr. Cooper warns Todd and the others not to attempt a fight between the two schools under threat of expulsion. Tired of being smothered by Renata, Todd breaks up with her. After being repeatedly warned again about Devon's selfishness by Jessica and having see how little he thought of one of the students from Big Mesa, Liz finally breaks up with him. Todd and Christian decide to try and call a truce for both Liz and Jessica's sake. Before the truce treaty can be signed, an angry Devon instigates a fight wanting revenge on Jessica for interfering with his relationship with Liz.
77	11	"Rumble in the Valley"	Steve Markowitz	Paul A. Kaplan & Joanne Fink	September 29, 1997
It looks like the feud between Sweet Valley and Big Mesa is finally over for good. Soon Jessica discovers the truth during her and Christian's date and hurries home. She immediately tells Liz and Enid about the fight being back on. Enid is convinced of this and now knew why Manny cancelled his date with her. Liz is skeptical and asks Jessica about the truce. She admitted that Christian told her everything including that he and Todd attempted a truce. However, Devon showed up at the Moon Beach and instigated a fight as a means to get revenge against Jessica for coming in between him and Elizabeth. Jessica is pushed unconscious in the middle of stopping the feud by an angry Devon, causing the others to stop and take her to the hospital. Now fully angered with what he did to her sister, Liz leaves him at the pier alone. The next day, Mr. Cooper overhears about the fight between the two schools. He not only suspends Todd and a few others involved in the fight, but also expels Devon for instigating it and assaulting Jessica. Christian is expelled from Big Mesa and must return to Delaware. Before leaving, he asks Jess to write to him everyday and she agrees. Liz breaks up with Devon for good after his latest antics almost cost Jessica: her life.
78	12	"Devon Breaklaw"	Bradley Battersby	Barry Stringfellow & Peggy Nicoll	September 30, 1997
A recently expelled Devon responds to Liz leaving him by vandalizing her locker and viciously stalking her. He later gets in serious trouble with the law. After bailing him out, Devon begs Elizabeth for another chance, but she refuses. Liz points out that she still hasn't forgiven him for what he did to Jessica, along with instigating a fight between their school and the Big Mesa students. She tells Devon to stay out of her life and see a psychiatrist for help. Renata asks Jessica to help her win Todd back and she suggests Renata try to be the All-American look. Todd decides enough is enough and prefers Renata to be herself.
79	13	"Skiing is Believing"	David Winning	Christopher Briggs & Peter Knight	October 1, 1997
Manny wants him and Enid to spend their anniversary together, but then decides instead to go on a skiing trip in the mountains and Jessica tries to win a downhill race. Elizabeth finds herself really lonely and missing what she had with Todd. Jessica ends up losing again and Liz suffers a sprained ankle. Wanting to save Liz, Jessica puts her feelings aside to get her sister to safety. Manny wants to come up and surprise Enid--and he wants Todd to come with him. But when a handsome man and Enid start to notice each other, everyone may wind up quite surprised.
80	14	"Single in Sweet Valley"	Susan Rohrer	Jordana Arkin	October 2, 1997
Jessica gets a stalker. A radio talk show picks a letter that Elizabeth writes and sets her up with a guy who just might be perfect for her. Liz is surprised that it's Todd.
81	15	"Sailing Solution"	Stuart Taylor	Paul A. Kaplan & Joanne Fink	October 3, 1997
Liz and Todd get back together. However, when Todd still doesn't seem like a very big priority to Elizabeth due to her preoccupation of both the awards show and Devon's situation, he breaks up with her again. Liz is forced to take a good look at herself after Jessica talks to her. She wisely convinces Liz to take advantage of being given yet another chance with Todd and not think about the award show. Liz takes this to heart and has Enid accept the award in her place, so she can spend time with Todd on his renovated yacht. Jessica and Lila compete in a Teen Girl magazine competition.
82	16	"Down by Whitelaw: Part 1"	David Winning	Peggy Nicoll & Barry Stringfellow	October 6, 1997
Liz agrees to help Devon with his anger problems. Devon is suspected of his parents murder by everyone, including his own classmates. Only Liz believes his innocence. Jessica feeds the flames by giving the tabloid reporters plenty of entertaining lies and later regrets it when an old enemy from Devon's family appears.
83	17	"Down by Whitelaw: Part 2"	David Winning	Barry Stringfellow & Peggy Nicoll	October 7, 1997
Devon learns what happened to his parents; Liz is taken hostage. Todd rushes in to save them both. Jessica intervenes as well, when Devon asks for her help. Jessica soon discovers that an old business partner was responsible for both the deaths of Devon's parents and Liz being taken hostage. To give Devon time to rescue Liz, Jess is armed with a tape recorder and poses as her long enough to keep the man occupied to confess to his crimes. When the man is arrested, Devon's good deeds readmits him back to Sweet Valley High.
84	18	"Swing Time"	David Winning	Joanne Fink & Paul A. Kaplan	October 8, 1997
Liz is worried that Todd had sex with Renata when they were together; Jessica is warned against working with a photographer who's intentions might not be what they seem.
85	19	"Down Horoscope"	Stuart Taylor	Christopher Briggs & Peter A. Knight	October 9, 1997
Enid reads a horoscope and actually believes Devon may have feelings for her. When Liz uses her Judo skills to protect Todd, he catches flack from everyone else in town and is inspired to take up martial arts himself. Despite all the drama, Jessica still has feelings for Devon and is trying to win him back. However out of guilt for what he did to her and Liz, Devon may never feel the same. That is until Jessica tells him that she's forgiven him for his behavior and that convinces Devon to at least try a relationship with her. Enid discovers that her horoscope reading actually pointed her to Manny, not Devon.
86	20	"A Simple Twist of Mates"	Steve Markowitz	Paul A. Kaplan & Joanne Fink	October 10, 1997
Todd accidentally kisses Jessica. And they both liked it. They attempt to keep it a secret, but it slips out over dinner, thanks to Winston's loose lips. Liz and Devon worry they may be harboring feelings for each other. None of them can stop thinking about it. Lila hasn't studied for the big test and cheats off of Enid, which Cheryl notices. However when Enid winds up being the one to be blamed for cheating on the test, Cheryl saves the day by telling the teacher, Mr. Weisman, that she caught Lila earlier cheating. She convinces him to take up her suggestion and have the two retake the test under the guise of a pop quiz. Weisman likes Cheryl's suggestion to have Enid and Lila retake the test in order to get one of them to confess. Eventually, Lila is fed up that she confesses to her wrongdoing in cheating off Enid and apologizes. Enid will only forgive her if she replaces her bike's old kickstand and Weisman tells Lila that he will inform her parents about her cheating. In addition to it, he will also have to flunk Lila and if she wants to raise her grades, she would have to do extra credit work at the library shelving books. At the house, Liz tells Jessica that she may be harboring feelings for Devon again and is worried that it may jeopardize her relationship with Todd. Jess reassures Elizabeth that she has moved on from it and that Todd loves Liz.
87	21	"Ticket to Lie"	Stuart Taylor	Peggy Nicoll & Barry Stringfellow	October 13, 1997
Jessica uses Liz's driver's license when she is pulled over for speeding, after having her own license suspended. When Todd discovers the upcoming answers to the test, he and Winston try to break into the school and return it, but are busted. Enid and Manny might have to break up after they find out they might be related, but are relieved when they learned they're not related. Jessica isn't spared of punishment even after she reluctantly helped clear Liz of the speeding ticket as she must also pick up trash alongside Winston and Todd.
88	22	"Animal Rights and Wrongs"	David Winning	Christopher Briggs & Peter Knight	October 14, 1997
Elizabeth backs out of a commercial she and Jessica were to shoot when she learns that the cosmetics company tests their products on animals. When Jessica learns of this crime, she joins Liz against the company for the support of animal rights. When it gets televised nationally, a rival cosmetic company "Nirvana" is sympathetic to the twins' plight and offers them a contract for them to appear in their commercial as part of their support for animal rights. Todd starts to ignore Winston to spend all his free time with the rest of the basketball team. When Winston turns to Enid for support, Todd realizes what he's been doing.
