= Dan Bradley =

American stunt coordinator

- Born: San Fernando Valley
- Occupations: Stunt coordinator, Second unit film director
- Known for: Stunt work
- Notable work: Bourne film series

Dan Bradley is an American stunt coordinator and second unit film director. He has worked on Independence Day, Spider-Man 2, Spider-Man 3, The Bourne Supremacy, The Bourne Ultimatum, Superman Returns, Indiana Jones and the Kingdom of the Crystal Skull, Where The Wild Things Are, Quantum of Solace, and Mission: Impossible – Ghost Protocol.

Bradley was born and raised in the San Fernando Valley and his early street racing around Van Nuys led him into his career in stunts.

He was originally cast to portray Jason Voorhees in Friday the 13th Part VI: Jason Lives but was replaced by C.J. Graham. Despite this the scenes he filmed were still included in the film making this the third instance of 2 actors portraying Jason in one film. (Note: Though the killer in Part 5 was not Jason, two people portrayed Jason in that film: John Hock in the opening dream sequence and Tom Morga in Tommy's Hallucinations.)

Bradley served as the stunt coordinator and second unit for the car chase scenes in The Dukes of Hazard. Johnny Knoxville praised him saying "everyone in Hollywood wants Dan Bradley to shoot their car stuff" and cited him as a factor in his taking a role in the film.

In July 2008, Bradley was announced as the director for the MGM remake of the 1984 Cold War movie Red Dawn, and was attached to the supernatural action feature Hellified for Paramount Pictures. In 2016, he made his debut in Indian Cinema, as the Second Unit Director and Stunt co-ordinator of the Bollywood film Ghayal Once Again.

== Filmography ==
=== As second unit director ===
Year	Film	Director
2025	The Old Guard 2	Victoria Mahoney
2023	Indiana Jones and the Dial of Destiny	James Mangold
2022	Jurassic World Dominion	Colin Trevorrow
2022	Deep Water	Adrian Lyne
2020	Wonder Woman 1984	Patty Jenkins
2019	Ad Astra	James Gray
2017	Bright	David Ayer
2017	XXX: Return of Xander Cage	D.J. Caruso
2016	Assassin's Creed	Justin Kurzel
2016	Triple 9	John Hillcoat
2016	Ghayal: Once Again	Sunny Deol
2014	The Expendables 3	Patrick Hughes
2014	Teenage Mutant Ninja Turtles	Jonathan Liebesman
2012	The Bourne Legacy	Tony Gilroy
2011	Mission: Impossible – Ghost Protocol	Brad Bird
2010	Green Zone	Paul Greengrass
2008	Quantum of Solace	Marc Forster
2008	Indiana Jones and the Kingdom of the Crystal Skull	Steven Spielberg
2007	Lions for Lambs	Robert Redford
2007	The Bourne Ultimatum	Paul Greengrass
2007	Spider-Man 3	Sam Raimi
2006	Superman Returns	Bryan Singer
2005	The Dukes of Hazzard	Jay Chandrasekhar
2004	The Bourne Supremacy	Paul Greengrass
2004	Spider-Man 2	Sam Raimi
2003	Seabiscuit	Gary Ross
2003	Cradle 2 the Grave	Andrzej Bartkowiak
2002	Adaptation	Spike Jonze
2001	Swordfish	Dominic Sena
2001	Texas Rangers	Steve Miner
2001	Monkeybone	Henry Selick
1999	From Dusk Till Dawn 3: The Hangman's Daughter	P.J. Pesce
1999	Three Kings	David O. Russell
1999	From Dusk Till Dawn 2: Texas Blood Money	Scott Spiegel
1998	Phantoms	Joe Chappelle
1994	Final Combination	Nigel Dick
1991	Critters 3	Kristine Peterson
1990	Blue Desert	Bradley Battersby
1989	Disorganized Crime	Jim Kouf
1987	Dark Tower	Freddie Francis
1987	Dudes	Penelope Spheeris
1986	Hollywood Vice Squad	Penelope Spheeris
