= Cheaper by the Dozen (2022 film) =

2022 film by Gail Lerner

- Official release poster
- Directed by: Gail Lerner
- Screenplay by: Kenya Barris; Jenifer Rice-Genzuk Henry
- Story by: Craig Titley; Kenya Barris; Jenifer Rice-Genzuk Henry
- Produced by: Kenya Barris
- Starring: Gabrielle Union; Zach Braff; Erika Christensen; Timon Kyle Durrett
- Cinematography: Mitchell Amundsen
- Edited by: Troy Takaki
- Music by: John Paesano
- Production companies: Walt Disney Pictures (Note: The film was produced by Walt Disney Pictures but the copyright is registered with 20th Century Studios, the latter who originally produced the film.); Khalabo Ink Society
- Distributed by: Disney+
- Release dates: March 16, 2022 (El Capitan Theatre); March 18, 2022 (United States)
- Running time: 107 minutes
- Country: United States
- Language: English

Cheaper by the Dozen is a 2022 American comedy film directed by Gail Lerner (in her feature directorial debut) from a screenplay written by Kenya Barris and Jenifer Rice-Genzuk Henry, with Shawn Levy serving as an executive producer. The film stars Gabrielle Union, Zach Braff, Erika Christensen, and Timon Kyle Durrett with supporting roles by Christian Cote, Sebastian Cote, Christina Anthony, Caylee Blosenski, Journey Brown, Brittany Daniel, Mykal-Michelle Harris, Cynthia Daniel Hauser (in her first acting role in 20 years), Abby Elliott, Ron Funches, Leo Abelo Perry, Luke Prael, June Diane Raphael, Andre Robinson, Kylie Rogers, and Aryan Simhadri. It tells the story of a White restaurant proprietor (Braff) and his second Black wife (Union) as they raise the children from the restaurateur's previous marriage, the second wife's family, and the children they later conceived as their respective exes are still involved in their children's lives.

Produced by Walt Disney Pictures, Cheaper by the Dozen had its world premiere at the El Capitan Theatre on March 16, 2022, and was released on Disney+ on March 18. The film was met with mixed reviews.

The film was a racially-diverse remake of the 2003 film of the same name, which was also a remake of the 1950 film of the same name.

Due to paying royalties, the film was removed from Disney+ on May 26, 2023, but was later made available digitally on September 26, 2023.

== Plot ==
The Bakers, a blended multiracial family, began with Paul and Kate Baker (White), who had daughters Ella and Harley. After their friends died in a car accident, they took in their Asian godson Haresh. Kate eventually divorced Paul, but they stayed friends, with Kate occasionally babysitting.

Zoey (Black) married football player Dominic "Dom" Clayton and had two children, Deja and DJ. However, due to Dom's phenomenon lifestyle, Zoey divorced him, gaining custody. She met Paul at his restaurant and suggested making the menu morning-themed all day. They married, expanded the restaurant into Baker's Breakfast, and had two sets of twins: Luca and Luna, and Bronx and Bailey.

Dom remains involved in Deja and DJ's lives, intimidating Paul, who was rarely present. As Deja prepares for her USC basketball scholarship, DJ feels a stronger connection with Paul than Dom. Paul secures a meeting with a major company to expand his restaurant and successfully gets his best-known food sauce on the store's aisle shelves. He uses the earnings to move the family and their dogs, Bark Obama and Joe Bitin', from Los Angeles to a bigger house (complete with a wheelchair ramp for Harley) in the gated community of Calabasas.

Zoey feels the effects of racist profiling after meeting her neighbor Anne. Paul receives a call that his sister Rachel is in rehab, so he takes in his nephew Seth, whom Ella and Harley label a criminal. Seth bonds with Haresh, who is bullied for his race, teaching him self-defense while making "monster spray" for his younger cousins. Rarely used on the Calabasa Hornets basketball team, Deja sneaks out to see her new boyfriend Chris.

Paul travels to find new restaurant locations as investors Melanie and Michele push for changes to cut costs. He misses time with family, frightening Zoey, who divorced Dom for similar reasons. Haresh and Seth are suspended for a week by their principal after fighting bullies, leading Zoey to ground them. On DJ's birthday, Paul rushes home. The party circles when DJ modifies his look for a girl named Thalia while Anne investigates a chain of break-ins involving Zoey's family. Upon Paul's arrival, Deja reveals she quit the Calabasa Hornets and the family's sadness in Calabasas. Concerned about Zoey and Paul's ability to parent, Dom announces he will seek full custody of Deja and DJ.

Harley and Ella accuse Seth of the break-ins after Haresh claims he saw him stealing from the cash register. Though Seth returned the money, he quits in anger. Paul and Zoey tell them the money is from DCFS, given to Seth, and that someone broke into Anne's house during the party while Seth and Haresh were confined to their room. Realizing their mistake, the Bakers, Kate, and Dom find Seth at where some friends of him live, apologize, and admit that he is part of the family, though he rejoins them unwillingly at first.

At home, Paul and Dom reflect on their child-raising. Paul doesn't know disadvantage, while Dom realizes his absence from his children has made him distant. Understanding his family's importance, Paul breaks his company deal to manage the restaurant himself. The Bakers relocate to Los Angeles, buy a new house, and the children return to their old schools, with Deja Elysian Park Wildcats which beat the Calabasa Hornets. During breakfast for dinner at Baker's Dozen Breakfast, Paul unveils a new sauce bottle design that includes Seth.

A postscript states that Dom, Paul, and Zoey invested their sauce and went national. Kate invented bird yoga. Seth moved back in with his recovered mother, but still spends time with his cousins. Deja and Chris started freshman year together. Ella became the social manager for Harley's punk rock band and went viral after performing at her school's talent show. Luna and Luca won the National Under 12 tennis division, reminiscent of the Williams sisters. DJ, Thalia, and Dom bonded at Comic-Con where it turns out that Dom likes Thor.

== Cast ==
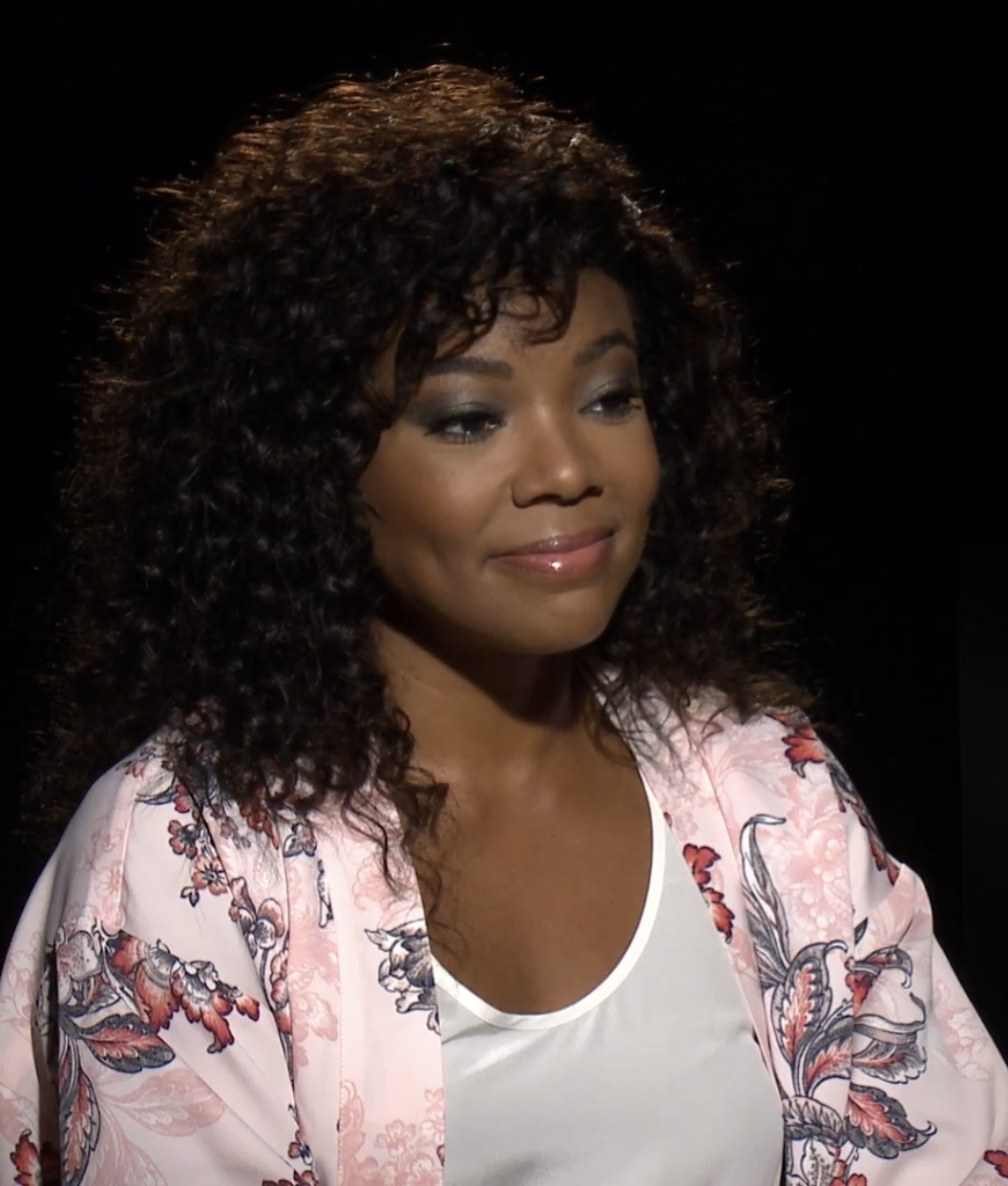
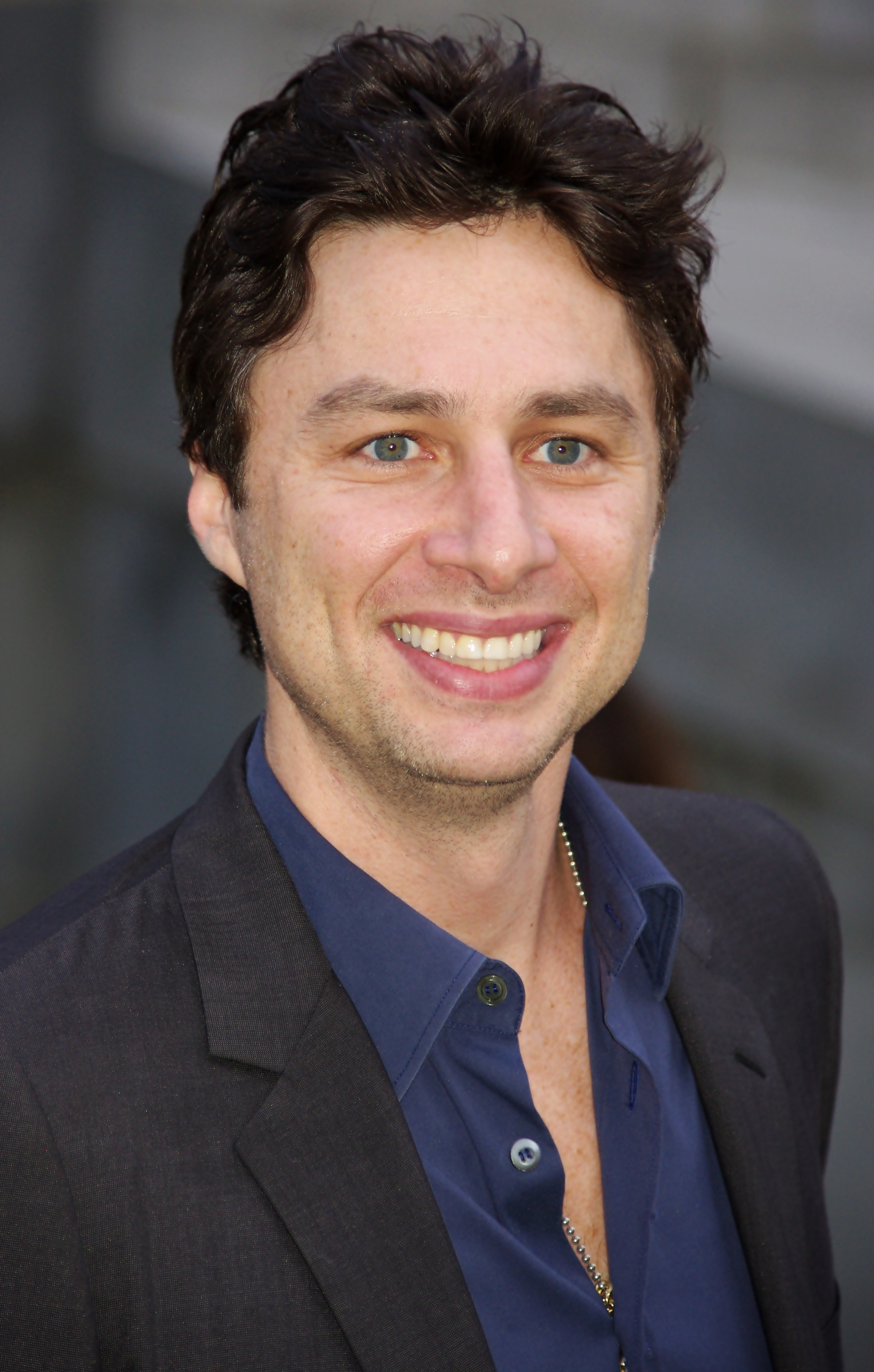
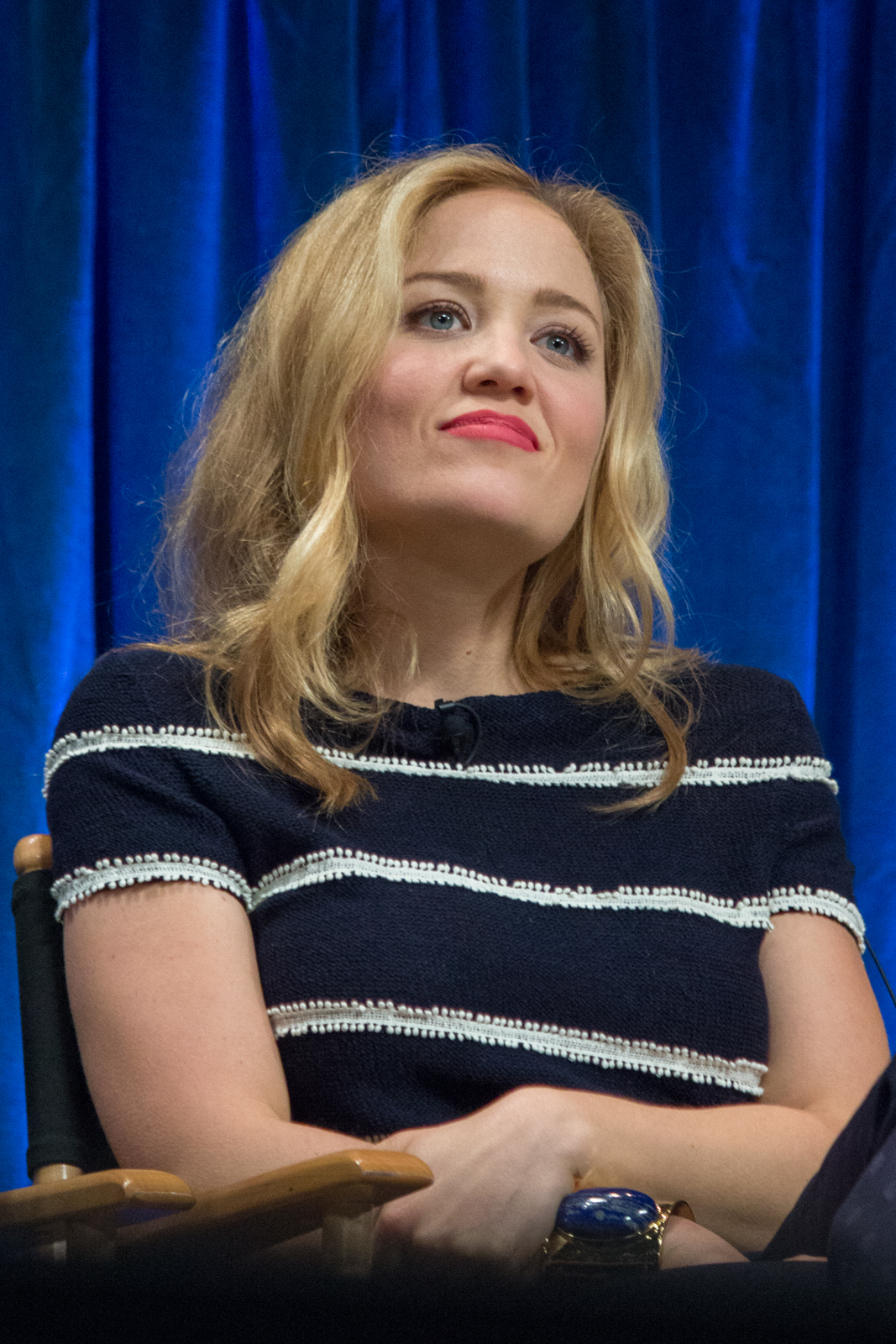
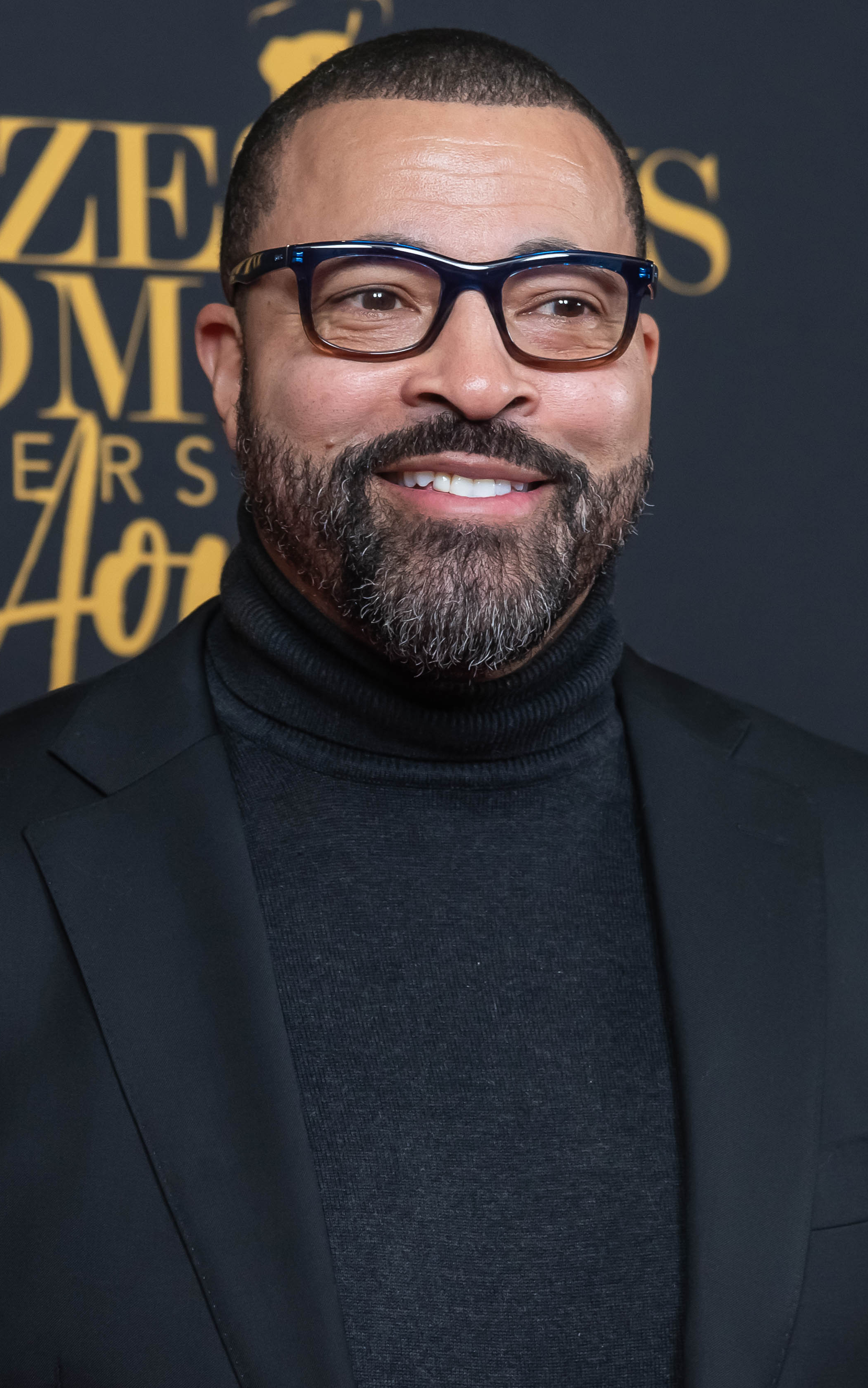
The film stars Gabrielle Union, Zach Braff, Erika Christensen and Timon Kyle Durrett.
- Gabrielle Union as Zoey Baker, the Black matriarch of the Baker family.
- Zach Braff as Paul Baker, the White patriarch of the Baker family and proprietor of the restaurant Baker's Breakfast.
- Erika Christensen as Kate Baker, the ex-wife of Paul and owner of a yoga studio who still watches her children on occasion.
- Timon Kyle Durrett as Dom Clayton, a football player who is the ex-husband of Zoey.
- Journee Brown as Deja Clayton, the daughter of Zoey and Dom and stepdaughter of Paul who is a basketball player with dreams of being a starting point guard for USC.
  - Kyrie McAlpin as 8-Year-Old Deja Clayton
- Kylie Rogers as Ella Baker, the first daughter of Paul and Kate who is a self-described future influencer.
- Andre Robinson as Dom "DJ" Clayton, Jr., the son of Zoey and Dom, brother of Deja, and stepdaughter of Paul who dreams of being the world's greatest Lego brick designer and the youngest comic book artist.
  - Elias Murphy as 3-Year-Old DJ Clayton
- Caylee Blosenski as Harley Baker, the disabled second daughter of Paul and Kate and sister of Ella who is an expert musician in her punk rock band where she plans to have them go viral.
  - Annalyn Black as 4-Year-Old Harley Baker
- Aryan Simhadri as Haresh Baker, the Asian godson of Paul and Kate and god-sibling of Ella and Harley who they adopted after his parents died in a car accident caused by a drunk driver and dreams of being a player. He later began styling his name with a $ (symbol of money) in place of an S.
  - Mark Jirgis as Baby Haresh Baker
  - Niam Saharan as 3-Year-Old Haresh Baker
- Leo Abelo Perry as Luca Baker-Clayton, the first son of Paul and Zoey, and the half-brother of Ella, Harley, Haresh, Deja and DJ.
- Mykal-Michelle Harris as Luna Baker-Clayton, the daughter of Paul and Zoey, fraternal twin sister of Luca, and the half-sister of Deja, Ella, DJ, Harley, and Haresh.
- Christian Cote as Bailey Baker-Clayton, the second son of Paul and Zoey, brother of Luca and Luna, and the half-brother of Deja, Ella, DJ, Harley, and Haresh.
- Sebastian Cote as Bronx Baker-Clayton, the third son of Paul and Zoey, identical twin brother of Bailey, brother of Luca and Luna, and the half-brother of Deja, Ella, DJ, Harley, and Haresh, but named after a metro borough in the state of NY.
- Luke Prael as Seth Baker, the nephew of Paul, step-nephew of Zoey, paternal cousin of Ella, Harley, and Haresh, step-cousin of Deja and DJ, and the half-cousin of Luca, Luna, Bailey, and Bronx with his family's shady history.
- Cynthia Murell as Rachel Baker, the sister of Paul and mother of Seth who has Paul watch over Seth while she is in rehab.
- Brittany Daniel and Cynthia Daniel Hauser as Melanie and Michele, twin sisters and workers at Cynax who are possible investors for Baker's Breakfast.
- June Diane Raphael as Anne Vaughn, an inhabitant of a Calabasas gated community who becomes the neighbor of the Baker family and whose racist profiling makes Zoey in discomfort.
- Simeon Daise as Chris, an inhabitant of a Calabasas gated community that Deja likes.
- Ron Funches as a local of an apartment place where Seth was found by his relatives.
- Lola Raie as Thalia, a Gothic girl and inhabitant of a Calabasas gated community who is DJ's love interest.
- Sierra Swartz as Kimmy Baron, an inhabitant of a Calabasa gated community and member of the Calabasa Hornets basketball team whose parents donated a gym to the school.
- Matthew Bellows as the Calabasa Hornets Coach
- Abby Elliott as Tricia, an inhabitant of a Calabasas gated community that befriends Zoey.
- John O'Brien as the unnamed principal of the Calabasa gated community's high school.
- Christina Anthony as an airline attendant that Paul tries to bribe into letting him on an airplane back to Calabasas.

Also in the film are the Baker family's pet Rottweiler Bark Obama and chihuahua Joe Bitin', who are named after Barack Obama (first African-American president circa 2009-16) and Joe Biden and are portrayed by two uncredited canine actors.

Late actors Clifton Webb and Myrna Loy briefly appear through archival audio from the 1950 film.

== Production ==
In 2016, it was reported that Kenya Barris would work with 20th Century Fox on a remake of Cheaper by the Dozen. On August 6, 2019, following the acquisition of 21st Century Fox by Disney, Disney CEO Bob Iger announced that a reboot of Cheaper by the Dozen was in development and that it would premiere on the company's streaming service, Disney+. Gail Lerner was set to direct the film with a script co-written by Kenya Barris and Jenifer Rice-Genzuk Henry. Lerner had worked for Barris as a writer on the ABC television series Black-ish and admired that he saw her not only as a writer but also a director. Principal photography was scheduled to commence on July 13, 2020, in Los Angeles, California. After filming was halted due to the COVID-19 pandemic, Disney's new CEO Bob Chapek announced that filming had resumed in November 2020. The film was revealed at the Disney Investors Day, along with the casting of Gabrielle Union.

In January 2021, Zach Braff joined the cast. In February 2021, Journee Brown, Kylie Rogers, Andre Robinson, Caylee Blosenski, Aryan Simhaldri, Leo Abelo Perry, Mykal-Michelle Harris, Christian Cote, Sebastian Cote, and Luke Prael joined the cast as the pair's children. Erika Christensen would be added to the cast in April. Filming had begun in Los Angeles by April 2021.

Shawn Levy, who previously directed the 2003 film adaptation, was confirmed in 2021 to be an executive producer on the film.

Also, Lerner thought it was important to adjust the film to accommodate the actors, and not have young performers speaking lines nor expressions that did not come across as realistic for them. Lerner said Zoey is the heart of the film, she acclaimed Union for not falling into tropes nor stereotypes, and not wanting to be pigeonholed as the stern mother and the finger-wagger. Union also served as an executive producer.

== Music ==
In the 2022 film version, John Paesano composed the musical score. The soundtrack was released on March 18, 2022, by Hollywood Records and Walt Disney Records.

R&B singer Brandy and her daughter, Sy'Rai Norwood-Smith, recorded an original song "Nothing Without You" for the film. It was played during the end credits.

== Release ==
On November 12, 2021, the film was revealed to be released in March 2022. On February 7, 2022, with the release of the official trailer, it was revealed that it would be digitally released on March 18, 2022, on Disney+. The film had its world premiere at the El Capitan Theatre on March 16. Following its removal from Disney+, it was made available on other streaming platforms, including Amazon Prime Video, Vudu and Google Play, on September 26, 2023.

== Reception ==
=== Audience viewership ===
According to Whip Media, Cheaper by the Dozen was the 5th most-streamed movie across all platforms in the United States during the week of March 18, 2022, to March 20, 2022.

=== Critical response ===
On the review aggregator website Rotten Tomatoes, 35% of 37 critics' reviews are positive, with an average rating of 5.1/10. The website's consensus reads: "Cheaper by the Dozen adds some modern twists to its oft-adapted story, but fresh laughs are few and far between." Metacritic, which uses a weighted average, assigned the film a score of 42 out of 100, based on 11 critics, indicating "mixed or average" reviews.

Variety stated: "Despite some of this movie’s missteps, the heart behind its messages is in the right place. Sentiments dealing with co-parenting after divorce and prioritizing family above monetary success may seem old fashioned on the surface. Yet it goes deeper, exploring and challenging our societal system’s gross inequities and injustices in a thoughtful, meaningful manner." IGN rated the movie 6 out of 10, stating, "Disney's latest reboot of Cheaper by the Dozen, starring Zach Braff and Gabrielle Union, can be as haphazard as its premise." The Guardian rated the movie 3 out of 5 stars, stating, "As with the 2003 film, the gist of Disney Plus’s remake is cheerful domestic chaos molded into light didacticism: the importance of the nuclear family (albeit a blended one, in this update) with reminders to not get blinded by financial success or the lure of growth." Screen Rant gave the movie 2.5 out of 5 stars, saying "Cheaper by the Dozen is a fluffy family drama that ultimately doesn’t amount to anything. [...] It is great that this blended family is so diverse, but if there is no thoughtful integration of their stories, they remain merely set dressing."

=== Accolades ===
The film received a nomination for Outstanding Makeup (Television or Film) at the 2023 NAACP Image Awards.
