= On Hostile Ground =

- Teleplay by: Brian L. Ross
- Story by: Sharon Y. Cobb
- Directed by: Mario Azzopardi
- Starring: John Corbett
- Theme music composer: Asher Ettinger; Tony Kosinec
- Countries of origin: United States; Canada
- Original language: English

Production
- Producer: Frank Siracusa
- Editor: Stephan Fanfara
- Running time: 90 minutes

Original release
- Network: TBS
- Release: June 11, 2000

On Hostile Ground is a 2000 American television film starring John Corbett. Directed by Mario Azzopardi, the film originally aired on TBS on June 11, 2000.

== Plot ==
John Corbett stars as Matt Andrews, a geologist who is asked to investigate why there have been two large sinkholes affecting the city of New Orleans. Jessica Steen plays Corbett's girlfriend Allison Beauchamp, assistant to the Mayor, who has to decide whether the problems with the sinkholes will spread far enough to require that the remainder of Mardi Gras be cancelled, which would be a complete economic disaster to the city.

Matt has a number of personal issues because of a disaster which happened at a mine he was advising on its operations. Although cleared of responsibility for the accident, he still blames himself, which may be causing him to be overcautious. Matt admits the potential problem of the sinkholes becoming so serious as to endanger the city could occur next week, or not for three hundred years. Based on the lack of real evidence of immediate danger, and because some evidence that she should have received has been destroyed by the mayor's political flack, Allison has decided not to close the festival, only to have the disaster metastasize, like a cancer devouring the city's underground.

The only answer is to obtain several tons of polyurethane liquid in 2 compounds which when combined produces an expanding foam that will fill the huge sinkhole cavern. The polyurethane expanding foam reaction is able to expand to hundreds of times its size, and becomes as hard as concrete afterwards. Due to an emergency, while Matt is underground inspecting the caverns, he becomes partially trapped, and has to ask to have the foam started (which will kill him if he can't find an escape) because if they don't start the flow of the liquid immediately, the ground underneath downtown New Orleans will collapse similar to the effects of soil liquefaction and thousands to tens of thousands of people will be injured or killed. The last few minutes of the film become a race against time as Matt attempts to find an exit before the polyurethane foam envelops him.

The film points to an event that would happen five years after the movie was made. Matt points out the sinkholes, if they do fail and open up, could be as serious a disaster to the city as if its levees collapsed, an event that did happen as a result of Hurricane Katrina in 2005.

== Reception ==
On Hostile Ground was compared unfavourably to Jaws and other precursor disaster films. Citing cheesy plot, poor acting, and lackluster effects, reviewers panned the made-for-TV flick.

== Cast ==
- John Corbett as Matt Andrews
- Jessica Steen as Allison Beauchamp
- Brittany Daniel as Cindy Evers
- Ardon Bess as Smiley
- Eugene Clark as Mayor John Lafitte
- Ron Gabriel as Councilman
- Quancetia Hamilton as Mrs. Smiley
- Derwin Jordan as Remy
- Andrew Kraulis as Dalton
- Shawn Lawrence as Andre
- Roger McKeen as Jimmy Gutro, PW Supervisor
- Peter Stebbings as George Regan

== Production notes ==
On Hostile Ground was filmed in New Orleans, Stouffville, Ontario, Uxbridge, Ontario, and Toronto.

It is noted that there are a number of errors in the making of the film. Despite the fact that New Orleans is actually below sea level, the movie shows sinkholes in a cavern extending more than 60 feet (18 m) underground, and bone dry, despite the fact that virtually any digging underground in the real New Orleans would result in flooded ground.
