= The Joyriders =

- Directed by: Bradley Battersby
- Written by: Jeff Spiegel; Bradley Battersby
- Produced by: Sarah Pillsbury; Midge Sanford; Cindy Bond
- Starring: Martin Landau; Shawn Hatosy; Elisabeth Moss; Heather McComb; Diane Venora; Kris Kristofferson
- Cinematography: Steven Fierberg
- Edited by: Terilyn A. Shropshire
- Music by: J. A. C. Redford
- Production company: PorchLight Entertainment
- Distributed by: Providence Entertainment
- Release date: April 16, 1999
- Running time: 93 minutes
- Country: United States
- Language: English
- Box office: $26,999

The Joyriders is a 1999 American crime drama film directed by Bradley Battersby and written by Jeff Spiegel and Bradley Battersby. The film stars Martin Landau as Gordon Trout.

== Plot ==
An elderly suicidal man is kidnapped for his car and his money by Cam (Shawn Hatosy), Crystal (Heather McComb) and Jodi (Elisabeth Moss), a trio of runaway teenagers who live on the streets.

His captors ad lib a road trip using Gordon as their reluctant bankroll. Gordon is increasing shaken and upset about the experiences he's put through, especially the reckless pranks and hijinks of Cam and Crystal.

Through the intervention of a rural minister (Kris Kristofferson), Gordon begins to see his captors in a different light: a tight group of friends that help each other out of tough places, because in spite of circumstances, they've each developed some personal character. Deciding to follow the minister's suggestion that in spite of kidnapping him, they deserve a second chance, Gordon eventually offers his friendship and help to his former captors. Their experiences together slowly make them a close-knit family, like Gordon hasn't experienced in a long time; his marriage is on his last legs, after personal and business failures. His wife has offered him one last chance to show her that he still wants to make a go of their life together, by meeting her cruise ship when it docks.

Meanwhile, the police have been in contact with Gordon's son. As he becomes aware of what has happened to him, he becomes more concerned with his father's mental state, especially as reports from the road make it sound like Gordon has been brainwashed by his captors. However, the police take the same reports as evidence that Gordon Trout appears to be a danger to himself and others, instead of a victim.

The intricacies of these complex relationships are explored through an emotional story with twists and turns. As the film moves to its conclusion, Gordon, Jodi, Cam and Crystal each try to improve their lives as they see fit. What will their outcomes be?

== Reception ==
The Joyriders was released in limited theatres in the United States and Canada on Apr 18, 1999. The film has received generally positive reviews on Rotten Tomatoes and Moviefone. Its DVD release date has been published as April 12, 1999. Per Rotten Tomatoes, its release date (streaming) was October 7, 2003.

== Cast ==
- Martin Landau as Gordon Trout
- Kris Kristofferson as Eddie
- Shawn Hatosy as Cam
- Heather McComb as Crystal
- Elisabeth Moss as Jodi
- Diane Venora as Celeste
- Steve Bond as Highway Patrolman
