= Sweet Valley High (TV series) =

American television series

- Genre: Comedy drama
- Based on: Sweet Valley High by Francine Pascal
- Developed by: Josh Goldstein; Jonathan Prince
- Starring: Brittany Daniel; Cynthia Daniel; Ryan James Bittle; Amy Danles; Bridget Flanery; Shirlee Elliot; Jeremy Vincent Garrett; Andrea Savage; Michael Perl; Harley Rodriguez
- Theme music composer: Ron Wasserman
- Opening theme: "Sweet Valley High" performed by Kathy Fisher
- Composers: Shuki Levy; Kussa Mahchi; Yuval Ron
- Country of origin: United States
- Original language: English
- No. of seasons: 4
- No. of episodes: 88 (list of episodes)

Production
- Executive producers: Francine Pascal; Haim Saban; Lance H. Robbins; Josh Goldstein, Abbie Charette, Showrunner (Seasons 2-4)
- Producers: William G. Dunn, Jr. Ronnie Hadar (Seasons 1–2)
- Production locations: Alexander Hamilton High School, Los Angeles, California
- Cinematography: Russ Brandt; David E. West
- Camera setup: Single-camera
- Running time: 21–23 minutes
- Production companies: Teen Dream Productions, Inc. Saban Entertainment; Saban International

Original release
- Network: Syndication (1994–1997); UPN (1997)
- Release: September 5, 1994 – October 14, 1997

Francine Pascal's Sweet Valley High is an American comedy-drama television series loosely based on Francine Pascal's book series of the same name. The program starred twin sisters Brittany Daniel and Cynthia Daniel as the two lead characters and ran from September 5, 1994, to October 14, 1997. The program was produced by Teen Dream Productions, Inc. in association with and distributed by Saban Entertainment in the United States, and its international sister company, Saban International N.V. in the Netherlands.

After three seasons in syndication (mostly on Fox stations), UPN acquired the show from Saban Entertainment in 1996. The fourth and final season was used to launch UPN's new teen programming on September 15, 1997. It then aired on The Fox Family Channel in 1998 until it became ABC Family in 2001. The show was also broadcast internationally, outside of the United States on BBC One and Disney Channel in the UK, Disney Channel in Sweden, Fox Kids/Jetix in France, Israel, and Greece, and on Fox Kids and Nickelodeon in the Netherlands.

Ownership of the series passed to Disney in 2001 when Disney acquired Fox Kids Worldwide, which also includes Saban Entertainment.

== Synopsis ==
The series revolves around the lives of Elizabeth and Jessica Wakefield, beautiful blonde twins who live in the fictitious Sweet Valley, California, and their gang of friends. Elizabeth is warm, friendly and sincere, while her twin sister Jessica is flirty, mischievous, and irresponsible.

== Episodes ==
Season	Episodes	Originally released	
Season	Episodes	First released	Last released
1	22	September 5, 1994	February 20, 1995
2	22	September 11, 1995	March 25, 1996
3	22	August 26, 1996	February 10, 1997
4	22	September 15, 1997	October 14, 1997

== Cast and characters ==
=== Main cast ===
- Brittany Daniel as Jessica "Jess" Wakefield, the outgoing, party loving, fashionable, and wilder Wakefield twin
- Cynthia Daniel as Elizabeth "Liz" Wakefield, the quieter, more sensible and down to earth Wakefield twin
- Amarilis (season 1) as Patty Gilbert, Jessica's cheerleader friend
- Ryan James Bittle (seasons 1–2) and Jeremy Vincent Garrett (seasons 3–4) as Todd Wilkins, Elizabeth's boyfriend
- Brock Burnett (season 1) and Christopher Jackson (season 2) as Bruce Patman, Todd and Winston's rival, and enemy of Jessica's
- Amy Danles as Enid Rollins, Elizabeth's best friend
- Bridget Flanery (seasons 1–2) and Shirlee Elliot (seasons 3–4) as Lila Fowler, Jessica's best friend
- Michael Perl as Winston Egbert, Todd's best friend
- Harley Rodriguez as Manny Lopez, Todd's and Winston's friend, and early on the right-hand man to Bruce Patman, Enid's eventual boyfriend
- John Jocelyn (season 3) as Reginald "Shred" Patman, Bruce's cousin and Winston's friend
- Andrea Savage (season 4) as Renata Vargas, Brazilian exchange student, Jessica's and Lila's friend, and briefly Todd's girlfriend
- Manley Pope (season 4) as Devon Whitelaw, boyfriend to Elizabeth and Jessica
- Tyffany Hayes as Cheryl "Tatyana" Thomas (seasons 2-4), supermodel friend of Elizabeth, Jessica and Todd

=== Notable guest stars ===
- Jason David Frank starred as A.J. in four episodes (season 3), and was a regular in Saban Entertainment's Mighty Morphin' Power Rangers franchise.
- Catherine Sutherland was another Mighty Morphin' Power Rangers actress who had her acting debut in season two as Ginger.
- Bailey Chase starred as Christian Gorman for three episodes (season 4) and later went on to be a series regular in shows including Buffy the Vampire Slayer, As the World Turns, and Longmire.
- Scott Foley had his acting debut in season two as Zack, kickstarting the career that would lead to him being a regular in Felicity, The Unit and Scandal.
- Jensen Ackles' second ever television role was in season three as Brad, long before his Days of our Lives and Supernatural fame.

== Production ==
In 1988, NBC bought the television rights to the Sweet Valley High book series. The show was originally intended to be a two-hour NBC Family special, with the possibility of becoming a series. In 1993, Francine Pascal mentioned in an interview that the rights to the books had been sold to Saban Entertainment. The show finally aired as a half-hour television series in September 1994.

Francine Pascal's daughter, Jamie Stewart, was the casting director and co-producer and held auditions throughout the country in 1988 for the lead roles of Jessica and Elizabeth Wakefield. Seven sets of twins were chosen from nearly 3000 entrants to do screen tests for NBC. In 1989 it was announced that sixteen-year-old twins Ericka and Sonja Carson had been cast as the leads, with a two-hour pilot to be produced that summer. The Carson twins went on to be cast as the Doublemint Twins in 1990 and attended acting classes in preparation for their Sweet Valley High roles, but the NBC pilot was never filmed.

In 1994 it was announced that eighteen-year-old sisters and another set of Doublemint Twins, Brittany Daniel and Cynthia Daniel, would be playing the leads in the series, which was now being produced by Saban Entertainment.

The cast participated in several public appearances to promote the series, including one in with Sweet Valley High creator, Francine Pascal, at the Mall of America in 1995. Another promotion included a competition to win a shopping spree with the Daniel twins.

The cast members were close, with the Daniels twins sharing an apartment with co-star Amy Danles in 1996. In 1999, Danles married Sweet Valley High co-star Manley Pope.

== Reception ==
The show drew in around 2 million viewers in its first four weeks. As of 1996, the show was airing on 104 station across the United States during its third season.

Upon its debut, the Houston Chronicle criticised the show, calling it "unrealistic and totally fantasy-oriented".

The show was dubbed in several languages for its international release, including German, Greek, Hungarian, Italian, Lithuanian, in French as California College: Les Jumelles De Sweet Valley, in Czech as Sladké údolí, in Polish as Słodka dolina, in Portuguese as E Aí Galera, in Spanish as Mellizas y rivales (Latin America) and Las gemelas de Sweet Valley (Spain), and in Turkish as Tatlı İkizler. Subtitled versions of the show aired in several countries, including Denmark, Estonia, Israel, Norway and Sweden.

In 1997, Grattan signed a deal with Saban Entertainment to launch a line of clothing based on the Sweet Valley High television series, due to its popularity with UK viewers. The line launched in 1998.

== Home media ==
In August 1996, two Sweet Valley High VHS tapes were released by WarnerVision Entertainment and Saban Home Entertainment titled 'Kidnapped' and 'Dangerous Love', which featured exclusive music videos based on the songs featured in the TV series, and behind the scenes footage. Although more releases were planned, they never saw the light of day after WEA folded WarnerVision Entertainment into Warner Home Video and ended their agreement with Saban.

On March 8, 2005, Buena Vista Home Entertainment released the complete first season of Sweet Valley High on DVD in Region 1. A DVD release of Season two was also planned, with an old promotional trailer being posted online in 2013; however, this release was cancelled.

== Streaming ==
All four seasons of the series are streaming on Prime Video, only for US Region as of January 19, 2023.

== Soundtrack ==
In 1995, a soundtrack album was released featuring original songs that were in the series along with a longer version of the show's theme song (sung by Kathy Fisher).

=== Track listing ===
1. "Sweet Valley High Theme" (Long version)
2. "Lotion" (Jessica's Theme)
3. "Rose Colored Glasses"
4. "She's Got the Answers"
5. "Not Myself Today"
6. "Alive"
7. "Rest of My Life"
8. "My Jessica"
9. "All to Myself"
10. "Secrets"
11. "My World"
12. "On Our Own"
13. "She Walks in Roses"
14. "Sweet Valley High Theme" (TV version)
