= Cynthia Daniel =

American photographer and former actress

- Born: March 17, 1976 (age 50); Gainesville, Florida, U.S.
- Other name: Cynthia Hauser
- Years active: 1989–1997; 2002; 2022
- Spouse: Cole Hauser (m. 2006)
- Children: 3
- Relatives: Brittany Daniel (older twin sister)

Cynthia Daniel (married name: Cynthia Hauser; born March 17, 1976) is an American photographer and former actress, best known for her role as Elizabeth Wakefield in the 1990s syndicated teen drama Sweet Valley High.

Daniel is the younger twin sister of actress Brittany Daniel.

== Early life ==
Born in Gainesville, Florida, Cynthia is five minutes younger than her twin sister, Brittany. They have an older brother, Brad. Their parents are Carol and Charlton B. Daniel, Jr. (who died of cancer in 2008).

At age 11, the girls began modelling and were signed to the Ford Agency, and appeared in YM and Sassy. They also appeared in ads for Doublemint gum as the Doublemint Twins.

== Career ==
Both twins made their television acting debut in a 1987 episode of The New Leave It to Beaver. In 1994, Daniel won the role of Elizabeth Wakefield in the television series Sweet Valley High, based on the book series by Francine Pascal (older sister Brittany played Elizabeth's twin, Jessica Wakefield). During Sweet Valley High's run, the girls made their film debut in the 1995 drama The Basketball Diaries.

After Sweet Valley High was canceled in 1997, Daniel retired from acting and became a photographer. She later appeared in a 2002 episode of That 80s Show, which also starred older twin sister Brittany. In 2022, Brittany and she starred in the 2022 remake of Cheaper by the Dozen, marking her first acting role since 2002.

== Personal life ==
Daniel and Cole Hauser began dating in the 1990s and wed in 2006. They have three children: two sons and a daughter.

== Filmography ==
Year	Title	Role	Notes
1989	The New Leave It to Beaver	Zorigna #2	Episode: "Man's Greatest Achievements"
1994	Burke's Law	Jenny	Episode: "Who Killed the Legal Eagle?"
1995	The Basketball Diaries	Winkie	
1994–1997	Sweet Valley High	Elizabeth 'Liz' Wakefield	Main role (88 episodes)
2002	That '80s Show	Bianca	Episode: "Sophia's Depressed"
2022	Cheaper by the Dozen	Michele	

== Awards ==
Year	Award	Result	Category	Title of work
1995	Young Artist Award	Won	Best Performance: Young Actress in a TV Comedy Series	Sweet Valley High (Shared with Brittany Daniel)
