= Bridget Flanery =

American actress

- Born: Bridget Christine Flanery; March 24, 1970 (age 56); Guthrie Center, Iowa, U.S.
- Education: Drake University (BA); Yale University (MFA)
- Occupation: Actress
- Years active: 1994–present
- Spouse: Brandon Christy (m. 2009)

Bridget Christine Flanery (born March 24, 1970) is an American actress and screenplay writer. She is sometimes credited as Bridget Flanery-Fownes.

== Early life and education ==
Born Bridget Christine Flanery, on March 24, 1970 in Guthrie Center, Iowa, Flanery is the daughter of Judith and James Flanery, the latter of whom was a county district clerk in Guthrie County before his death in 1987. Flanery has a sister, Jill, and three brothers, James, William and John.

Flanery attended Guthrie Center Elementary School, where she was receiving accolades for her acting as early as 1982. In high school, she starred as Anne Sullivan in The Miracle Worker at the age of 15, winning the role over several older students.

Flanery studied Theatre and Dance at Drake University, graduating in 1992. After graduation, she relocated to Los Angeles to pursue a career in acting. She later received her MFA from Yale School of Drama.

== Career ==
While a student at Drake University, Flanery appeared in several local productions at Wichita Summer Theater, including Blithe Spirit, A Funny Thing Happened on the Way to the Forum, To Gillian on her 37th Birthday, Fatal Attraction, and Nunsense. She also appeared in several commercials while in college.

Upon graduating from Drake, Flanery moved to LA and booked her first television role playing a high school student in Sweet Dreams. In 1994, she was cast as Lila Fowler in the comedy-drama series Sweet Valley High. She was part of the main cast until 1996, when she was replaced by Shirlee Elliot. Between 1996 and 1998, she portrayed Jill on the sitcom Sabrina the Teenage Witch.

Flanery has appeared in several guest starring television roles, including Teen Angel, Unhappily Ever After, Love Boat: The Next Wave, Will & Grace, Desperate Housewives, Boy Meets World, Out of Practice, Without a Trace, Hart of Dixie, Babylon 5, All My Children, Guiding Light, Pearl and Two and a Half Men. She was nominated for a Young Artist Award in 1997 for the Best Performance in a TV Comedy — Guest Starring Young Performer for the television show Pearl.

In 1997, Flanery starred as Kathy in Vanities at the Ann Arbor Summer Festival. She went on to have many more theater roles throughout the 2000s, including A Streetcar Named Desire at the Yale Repertory Theatre, Loves and Hours at the Old Globe Theatre, Cats Talk Back at the New York International Fringe Festival, Twelfth Night at the Shakespeare Festival LA, Spring Awakening at the Clemente Soto Velez Cultural Center, The Rainmaker at The Noise Within, The Taming of the Shrew at The Odyssey, The Psychic at The Falcon Theater, The Road to Appomattox at Colony Theater, Three Sisters at Studio Theatre, New York Water at the Pico Playhouse.

Her roles in The Rainmaker and The Taming Of The Shrew awarded her Best Performance By A Lead Actress (Comedy) by StageSceneLA in 2010. Flanery has also written several screenplays which have won awards on the festival circuits, including Best Screen Feature Screenplay for Gossamer Folds at the George Linley UNA Film Festival in 2012.

In 2009, Flanery starred in a film directed by her old Drake classmate, Sean Gannon. The film, Something Blue, was screened at the Starz Denver Film Festival, and filmed in Flanery's native Iowa. In 2010 she co-wrote the pilot episode of the show Complete Bull, with Colleen Krantz, who is also from Guthrie Center.

Flanery wrote the screenplay for the 2020 film, Gossamer Folds, which tells the story of a transgender woman befriending her young neighbour in the 1980s. The film was shown at several festivals, and was nominated for the 2022 GLAAD Media Award for Outstanding Film: Limited Release.

From 2019-2023, Flanery taught acting at The Studio School in Los Angeles. Since then, she had been the Academic Department Director for Acting at the American Musical and Dramatic Academy. She has also taught acting classes at Drake University since 2015.

== Personal life ==
Flanery married composer Brandon Fownes (sometimes known as Brandon Christy) on August 8, 2009. The couple divorced in 2021.

== Filmography ==
Film
Year	Title	Role	Notes
1994	Encounter	Cat	Short film
1996	Fatal Expressions	Kathy Kelly	
2009	Something Blue	Kathleen O'Connell	

Television
Year	Title	Role	Notes
1994-1996	Sweet Valley High	Lila Fowler	44 episodes
1996	Weird Science	Courtney	Episode: "Grumpy Old Genie"
1996	Boy Meets World	Lisa	Episode: "Singled Out"
1996	7th Heaven	Susan Barrett	Episode: "Saturday"
1996	California Dreams	Girl who makes announcement	Episode: "The Fashion Man"
1996–1998	Sabrina the Teenage Witch	Jill	9 episodes
1997	Pearl		Episode: "Power Play"
1997	Knots Landing: Back to the Cul-de-Sac	Lisa	TV miniseries
1997	Unhappily Ever After	Bunny	Episode: "Sorority Girl"; Episode: "Ryan Vampire Slayer"
1997-1998	Teen Angel	Jessica Fishman	4 episodes
1998	Beyond Belief: Fact or Fiction	Miranda	Episode: "Dead Friday"
1998	Babylon 5	Zoe	Episode: "Day of the Dead"
1998	The Outsider	Lita Hayworth	TV movie
1999	The Love Boat: The Next Wave	Simone	Episode: "Such Sweet Dreams"
2005	Without a Trace	Beth Norwood	Episode: "Lone Star"
2005	Will & Grace	Viv Cassidy	Episode: "Kiss and Tell"; Episode: "Friends with Benefits"
2005	Out of Practice	Mary	Episode: "Breaking Up is Hard to Do. And Do. And..."
2008	Two and a Half Men	Katie	Episode: "Damn You, Eggs Benedict"
2008	Desperate Housewives	Peggy	Episode: "Back in Business"
2011	Hart of Dixie	Becky Hilson	Episode: "The Pirate & the Practice"
