= Timon Kyle Durrett =

American actor

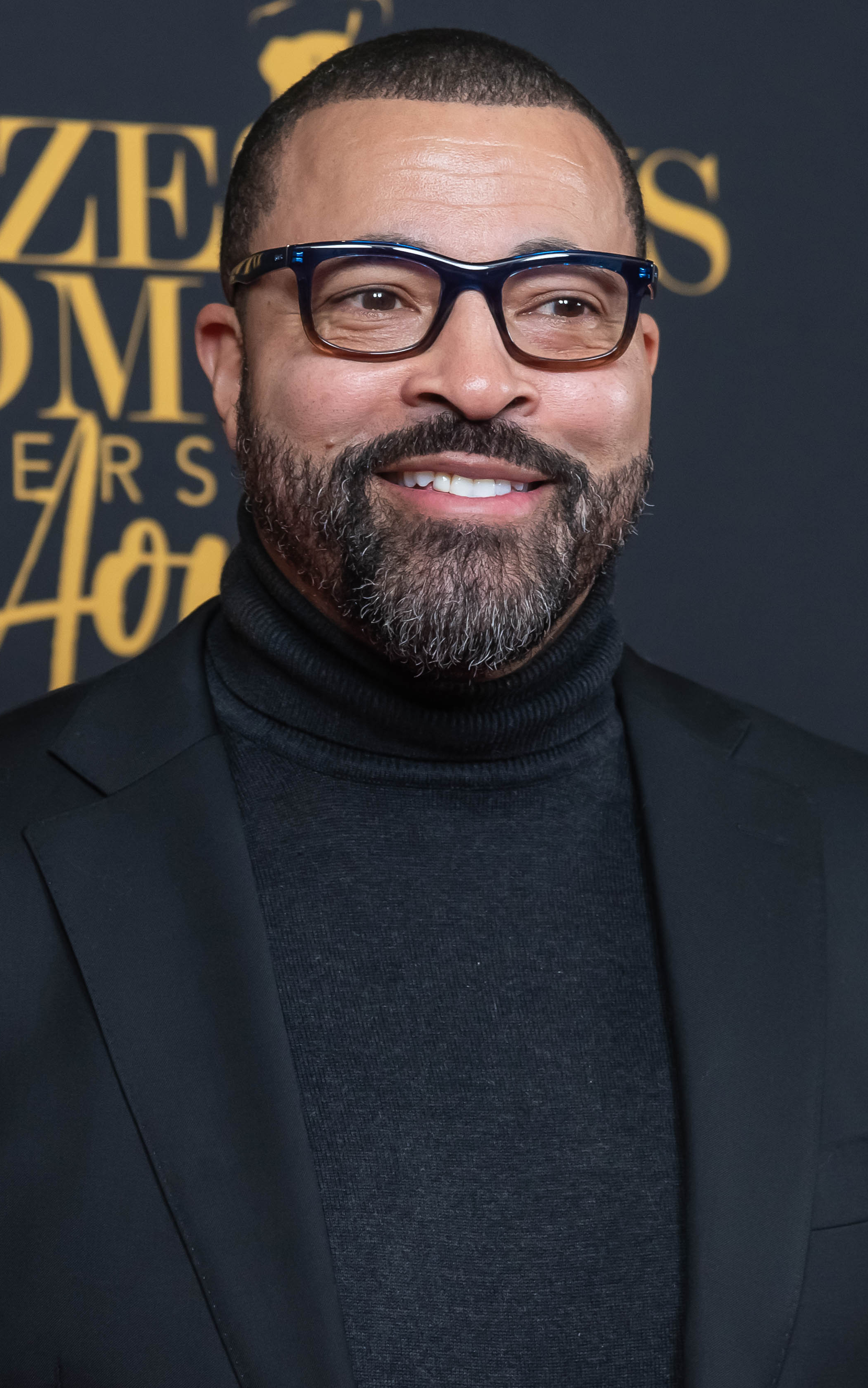
- Durrett in 2024
- Born: July 12, 1973 (age 53); Chicago, Illinois, U.S
- Occupation: Actor
- Years active: 1999–present

Timon Kyle Durrett (born July 12, 1973) is an American actor. He starred in the Oprah Winfrey Network drama series Queen Sugar (2016–2021) and the 2022 comedy film, Cheaper by the Dozen. Since February 2025, Durrett has played the role of Bill Hamilton on the CBS daytime soap opera Beyond the Gates for which he received a Daytime Emmy Award nomination for Outstanding Supporting Actor in a Drama Series in 2026.

== Life and career ==
Durrett was born and raised in Chicago, Illinois. He graduated from the Alcorn State University where he was a member of the basketball team. Soon after, he moved to Los Angeles and began acting career appearing in the small independent films and guest-starring roles in television series such as Girlfriends, Eve, CSI: Miami, Heroes, Castle and Single Ladies. He also appeared in the comedy films Like Mike (2002) and Barbershop: The Next Cut (2016).

In 2016, Durrett was cast in the Oprah Winfrey Network drama series Queen Sugar created and executive produced by Ava DuVernay. He was a regular cast member during the show' first two seasons and appeared in a recurring basic later to its finale in 2021. In 2022, he appeared in Cherish the Day also produced by Ava DuVernay. In 2020, he starred in the Allblk romantic drama series, Stuck With You. He also starred in films Her Only Choice (2018) opposite Denise Boutte, the remake of Cheaper by the Dozen (2022) as Gabrielle Union's ex-husband, and The Final Say (2023) alongside Deborah Joy Winans. In 2024, Durrett was cast as Bill Hamilton in the CBS soap opera, Beyond the Gates.

== Filmography ==
Film roles
| Year | Title | Role | Notes |
|---|---|---|---|
| 1999 | Deep Passion | Tim | |
| 2000 | The Teach | Dolan | Short film |
| 2002 | Like Mike | Henderson | |
| 2003 | Platinum Playaz | Kevin's Brother | |
| 2005 | Severed Ties | Paul | |
| 2005 | Choker | Willis | |
| 2007 | Lords of the Underworld | Hall | |
| 2008 | Stiletto | Nightclub Doorman | |
| 2009 | A Hero's Unsung Dignity | Kyle | |
| 2015 | 72 Hours | Von | |
| 2015 | Zodiac Sign | Ramon | |
| 2016 | Barbershop: The Next Cut | Officer Terrence | |
| 2016 | For the Love of Christmas | Von | |
| 2017 | Boxing Day: A Day After Christmas | Richie | |
| 2017 | The Fix | Devon | |
| 2018 | Her Only Choice | Bernie | |
| 2019 | Professor Mack | Lance Outlaw | Also executive producer |
| 2019 | London Mitchell's Christmas | Dr. McArthur | |
| 2019 | Everyday But Christmas | Jordan Dawkins | |
| 2022 | Cheaper by the Dozen | Dom Clayton | Disney+ original film |
| 2023 | The Final Say | Vaughn | BET+ original film |

Television roles
| Year | Title | Role | Notes |
|---|---|---|---|
| 2003 | Girlfriends | Brian | Episode: "The Pact" |
| 2003 | CSI: Miami | Durrett | Episode: "Bait" |
| 2004 | Eve | | Episode: "Valentine's Day Reloaded" |
| 2004 | The Young and the Restless | Jim Edwards | Recurring role |
| 2005 | CSI: NY | TARU Office Jasper | Episode: "The Dove Commission" |
| 2006 | Vanished | Guard | Episode: "The Proffer" |
| 2007 | Las Vegas | Vegas Cop | Episode: "When Life Gives You Lemon Bars" |
| 2007 | Heroes | Hazmat Guy | Episodes: "Chapter Seven 'Out of Time'" and "Chapter Ten 'Truth & Consequences'" |
| 2007 | Samantha Who? | Russ | Episode: "The Break Up" |
| 2009 | Melrose Place | Guard | Episode: "Vine" |
| 2010 | Ghost Whisperer | Sheriff | Episode: "Dead Ringer" |
| 2011 | Single Ladies | Quinn Davis | 3 episodes |
| 2012 | Castle | Toby Lang | Episode: "Til Death Do Us Part" |
| 2012 | Are You There, Chelsea? | Fireman Mike | Episode: "Believe" |
| 2016 | Zoe Ever After | Jordan | Episode: "The Third Wheel Gets Slapped" |
| 2019 | Pride & Prejudice: Atlanta | Antwan Tippett Jr. | Television film |
| 2020 | Stuck with You | Luvell | Series regular |
| 2016–2021 | Queen Sugar | Davis West | Series regular |
| 2022 | Cherish the Day | Davis West | Episode: "Sands for Shores" |
| 2025 | Beyond the Gates | Bill Hamilton | Series regular |

== Awards and nominations ==
List of awards and nominations
| Year | Award | Category | Work | Result | Ref. |
|---|---|---|---|---|---|
| 2026 | Daytime Emmy Award | Outstanding Supporting Actor in a Drama Series | Beyond the Gates | Nominated | |
