= Brittany Daniel =

American actress (born 1976)

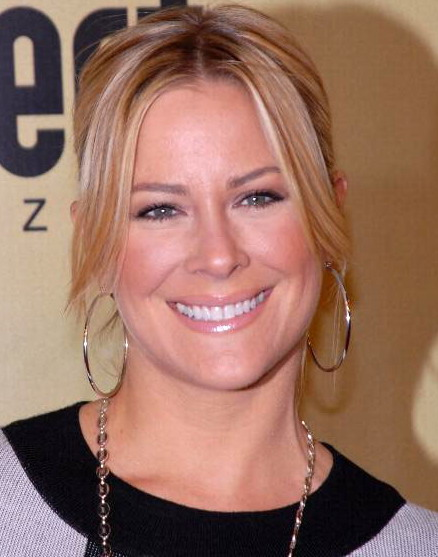
- Daniel in 2007
- Born: Brittany Ann Daniel; March 17, 1976 (age 50); Gainesville, Florida, U.S.
- Occupation: Actress
- Years active: 1989–present
- Spouse: Adam Touni (m. 2017)
- Partner: Keenen Ivory Wayans (2007–2014)
- Children: 1
- Relatives: Cynthia Daniel (twin sister); Cole Hauser (brother-in-law)

Brittany Ann Daniel (born March 17, 1976) is an American actress. Daniel is best known for her roles as Jessica Wakefield in the teen drama series Sweet Valley High (1994–1997) and as Kelly Pitts in the CW/BET comedy-drama series The Game (2006–2011; 2014–2015). Her film credits include Brandy in Joe Dirt (2001) and its sequel Joe Dirt 2: Beautiful Loser (2015), White Chicks (2004), and Skyline (2010).

Daniel is the twin sister of photographer and former actress Cynthia Daniel.

== Early life ==
On March 17, 1976, Brittany and her twin sister, Cynthia, were born in Gainesville, Florida, to Carolyn and Charlton Bradford "C.B." Daniel Jr. They have an older brother, Brad. By age 11, both girls were signed to the Ford Agency and began modeling. They appeared in Seventeen and YM. They also appeared in ads for Doublemint gum as the Doublemint Twins.

== Career ==
Both girls began acting in the 1989 with an appearance in the sitcom The New Leave It to Beaver. In 1992, when she was sixteen, Brittany won the role of Mila Rosnovsky on the short-lived syndicated teen drama Swan's Crossing. She then moved to New York to film the series.

After high school, she landed the role of Jessica Wakefield in the television series Sweet Valley High (twin sister Cynthia portrayed Jessica's twin, Elizabeth). During the run of Sweet Valley High, they made their film debut in the drama The Basketball Diaries (1995) alongside Leonardo DiCaprio.

After Sweet Valley High was canceled in 1997, Daniel continued acting in films and television series including a stint on Dawson's Creek in 1999 and a role in the TBS television movie On Hostile Ground the following year. In 2001, she appeared as David Spade's love interest, Brandy, in Joe Dirt, and in 2015, she appeared in the sequel Joe Dirt 2: Beautiful Loser. In 2002, Daniel played one of the lead characters in the short-lived Fox series That '80s Show.

In 2002, she played Eric Forman's cousin Penny on That '70s Show. Daniel appeared on the show It's Always Sunny in Philadelphia as a transgender woman named Carmen. She teamed with the Wayans Brothers for their films White Chicks (2004) and Little Man (2006). That same year, she appeared in the VH1 television movie Totally Awesome before landing a lead role in The CW's half-hour comedy The Game, which she starred in until 2011. However, she would return to the show in 2014. In February 2010, she was cast in the Brothers Strause thriller Skyline; the film was released on November 12, 2010.

== Personal life ==
In March 2014, Daniel revealed her reason for her departure from The Game in 2011, was due to her being diagnosed with Stage 4 Hodgkin lymphoma, for which she underwent chemotherapy. As of 2014, she was cancer-free.

She dated actor Keenen Ivory Wayans from 2007 to 2014. In 2017, she married Adam Touni. She welcomed a daughter in October 2021, after her twin sister, Cynthia, donated her egg.

== Filmography ==
=== Film ===
| Year | Title | Role |
|---|---|---|
| 1995 | The Basketball Diaries | Blinkie |
| 1999 | Sonic Impact | Rachel |
| 2001 | Joe Dirt | Brandy |
| 2004 | Club Dread | Jenny |
| 2004 | White Chicks | Megan Vandergeld |
| 2005 | Dirty | Tatiana |
| 2006 | Rampage: The Hillside Strangler Murders | Samantha Stone |
| 2006 | Little Man | Brittany |
| 2006 | The Hamiltons | Dani Cummings |
| 2007 | Last of the Romantics | Sarah Xavier |
| 2007 | Loveless in Los Angeles | Kelly Liffen |
| 2010 | Skyline | Candice |
| 2015 | Joe Dirt 2: Beautiful Loser | Brandy |
| 2022 | Cheaper by the Dozen | Melanie |

=== Television ===
| Year | Title | Role | Notes |
|---|---|---|---|
| 1989 | The New Leave It to Beaver | Zorigna #1 | Episode: "Man's Greatest Achievements" |
| 1992 | Swans Crossing | Mila Rosnovsky | Regular role (54 episodes) |
| 1994 | Burke's Law | Ginny | Episode: "Who Killed the Legal Eagle?" |
| 1994–1997 | Sweet Valley High | Jessica "Jess" Wakefield | Main role (88 episodes) |
| 1999 | Dawson's Creek | Eve Whitman | Recurring role (4 episodes) |
| 2000 | Fortunate Son | N/A | Television film |
| 2000 | On Hostile Ground | Cindy Evers | Television film |
| 2002 | That '70s Show | Penny | Episode: "Eric's Hot Cousin" |
| 2002 | That '80s Show | Sophia | Main role (13 episodes) |
| 2003 | Just Shoot Me! | Sarah | Episode: "The Goodbye Girl" |
| 2003 | 111 Gramercy Park | Brynn Martin | Television film |
| 2004 | North Shore | Cari Layne | Episode: "Pilot" |
| 2005; 2007; 2010 | It's Always Sunny in Philadelphia | Carmen | 4 episodes |
| 2006 | Totally Awesome | Kimberly | Television film |
| 2006 | Community Service | Carly Phillips | Television film |
| 2006–2011; 2014–2015 | The Game | Kelly Pitts | Main role: Seasons 1–3; Recurring role: Seasons 4, 7–9 (80 episodes) |
| 2008 | Ruby | Herself | Episode: "Meet Ruby" |
| 2016–2019 | Black-ish | Blair | 4 episodes |
| 2020 | BlackAF | Dr. Peterson | Episode: "hard to believe, but still because of slavery" |

== Awards and nominations ==
| Year | Award | Result | Category | Film or series |
|---|---|---|---|---|
| 1993 | Young Artist Award | Nominated | Best Young Actress in an Off-Primetime Series | Swans Crossing |
| 1995 | Young Artist Award | Won | Best Performance: Young Actress in a TV Comedy Series (shared with Cynthia Daniel) | Sweet Valley High |
| 2007 | New York International Independent Film & Video Festival | Won | Best Actress | Last of the Romantics |
| 2007 | MTV Movie Awards | Nominated | Best Kiss (shared with Marlon Wayans) | Little Man |
| 2010 | Daytime Emmy Awards | Nominated | Outstanding Special Class Series (shared with the cast) | Ruby |
