= Studio School Los Angeles =

School in California, United States

Coordinates: 34.0545°N 118.2604°W

Studio School Los Angeles was a performing arts and film school located in downtown Los Angeles. The school was founded in 2013 by Glenn Kalison, American actor, producer and entrepreneur, as Relativity School with the former film studio, Relativity Media. The name was changed to Studio School in 2017 following Relativity Media's bankruptcy. Hussian College Los Angeles initially launched its accredited BFA programs in October 2014, as a branch campus of Philadelphia's Hussian School of Art, and did so in affiliation with a major film studio. Recently, the Studio School Los Angeles name was changed to Hussain College Los Angeles (HCLA), and later to Hussain College - In Studio, its current name. Hussian College and all of its campuses abrubtly shut down in 2023 having lost accreditation and federal funding.

The school graduated its inaugural class in Spring 2018 in a commencement ceremony that took place at historic Mack Sennett Studios. Ikumi Yoshimatsu, Japanese actress and social activist, and Lance Young, former DreamWorks Animation head of Creative Affairs gave the commencement addresses. By May, 2023, the college permanently closed after the Accrediting Commission of Career Schools and Colleges warned it of concerns about student achievement. An instructor who had been hired in 2022 had been warned that enrollment had been falling.
