= Blue Desert (film) =

1991 film by Bradley Battersby

- DVD cover
- Directed by: Bradley Battersby
- Written by: Arthur Collis; Bradley Battersby
- Starring: Courteney Cox; D. B. Sweeney; Craig Sheffer; Sandy Ward
- Cinematography: Paul Murphy
- Edited by: Debra Bard
- Music by: Joel Goldsmith
- Distributed by: First Look Pictures
- Release date: January 9, 1991
- Running time: 98 minutes
- Country: United States
- Language: English

Blue Desert is a 1991 American psychological thriller film directed by Bradley Battersby, and starring Courteney Cox and D. B. Sweeney. The original music score is composed by Joel Goldsmith. The filming locations were Inyokern, California and Red Rock Canyon State Park, Cantil, California.

== Plot summary ==
A rape victim, comic book artist Lisa Roberts is given the runaround by the New York City Police Department. Tired of city life, she heads for the wide open spaces of Arizona. Not long afterward, she is propositioned by lowlife Randall Atkins. She reports this to sympathetic local policeman Steve Smith, who replies matter-of-factly that this is not the first time that Atkins has been accused of a sexual offense.

To her amazement, Roberts is later visited by Atkins, who agitatedly warns her not to trust the sweet-natured policeman. Someone is lying about something, and Roberts plainly does not know what to believe. When she finds out, it is nearly too late.

== Main cast ==
- Courteney Cox as Lisa Roberts
- D. B. Sweeney as Steve Smith
- Craig Sheffer as Randall Atkins
- Sandy Ward as Walter
- Philip Baker Hall as Joe

== Reception ==
Kevin Thomas of the Los Angeles Times compared Blue Desert positively to Thelma & Louise, calling it "taut and terrific".
