= Bradley Battersby =

American film director and screenwriter

Bradley Battersby is an American film director and screenwriter. He is the former chair of the Film Department at the Ringling College of Art and Design in Sarasota, Florida.

He was named "Mentor of the Year" by Variety magazine in 2017.

== Filmography ==
=== Writer & director ===
- Jesus the Driver (2004)
- Red Letters (2000)
- The Joyriders (1999)
- Blue Desert (1991)
