= Tempest (Smallville) =

- Smallville episode
- While filming, Greg Beeman created parallels with the development of the characters and the development of the approaching tempest.
- Episode no.: Season 1 Episode 21
- Directed by: Greg Beeman
- Story by: Philip Levens
- Teleplay by: Alfred Gough; Miles Millar
- Production code: 227620
- Original air date: May 21, 2002

Episode chronology
← Previous "Obscura"	Next → "Vortex"
- Smallville season 1

"Tempest" is the twenty-first episode and season finale of the first season of The WB original series Smallville. The episode originally aired on May 21, 2002; Alfred Gough and Miles Millar wrote the script, and Greg Beeman directed. In the episode's narrative, Lex attempts to forge his own destiny away from LuthorCorp; Whitney leaves Smallville for the Marines; Roger Nixon discovers Clark's secret and attempts to expose him to the world; and Lana is pulled into a tornado.

Director Greg Beeman attempted to create a visual theme among the characters that would parallel the approaching storm. The episode would mark the departure of Eric Johnson as Whitney Fordman, though he would return as a special guest in seasons two and four. Although the Smallville finale pulled in just over half of the viewership attained by the pilot episode, it was still favorably received by critics. It was also nominated for two awards.

== Plot ==
Lionel Luthor (John Glover) shows up at the Smallville LuthorCorp plant, and announces that "management failure" has forced him to shut the plant down. Effectively blaming the problem on Lex (Michael Rosenbaum), Lionel informs his son he wants him to return to Metropolis. Clark (Tom Welling), Pete (Sam Jones III), Chloe (Allison Mack), and Lana (Kristin Kreuk) make plans for the spring formal. Whitney (Eric Johnson) informs Lana that he is enlisting in the Marine Corps, and he leaves for basic training the day of the dance.

Lex tries to initiate an employee buyout, and convinces the employees to provide the financial resources by mortgaging their homes. Lionel learns of Lex's plans and buys the Smallville Savings & Loan, so that he may foreclose on all the property. Roger Nixon (Tom O'Brien) tests Clark's abilities by setting off a bomb in his truck, while he is inside. Nixon confronts Clark in the Talon coffee shop, but Lex intervenes on Clark's behalf. Nixon follows Clark home and overhears a conversation about Clark's ship being in the storm cellar, and that Lex has the missing piece from the ship. Nixon goes to the Luthor mansion and steals the octagonal key, and immediately returns to the storm cellar with a video camera.

Clark, Chloe, and Pete arrive at the dance, and say their goodbyes to Whitney before he leaves for training. The weather begins to deteriorate, and a storm picks up, as Lana takes Whitney to the bus stop. Jonathan (John Schneider) and Martha (Annette O'Toole) decide to head to the storm cellar to seek cover from the storm, and they discover Nixon just as the octagonal disk activates the ship. Nixon attempts to escape with the videotape, and Jonathan chases out into the storm after him. The ship levitates off the ground and flies out of the storm cellar. Lana says goodbye to Whitney and drives home. On her way, storm winds force her off the road, right next to three tornadoes that have touched down. The students at the dance are alerted to the tornados that have been sighted, and Clark races off to make sure Lana is all right. The three tornadoes merge into one large tornado and move in Lana's direction. Clark arrives just as Lana, in the truck, is sucked into the tornado's vortex; Clark speeds into the tornado to rescue her.

== Production ==
When thinking of how to end the first season, two things were clear to Alfred Gough and Miles Millar: the final episode would have the school prom, and there would be tornadoes. Although Jeph Loeb's Superman for All Seasons, which inspired Gough and Millar when they created the show, contains an event where a tornado hits Smallville, the pair insist that the tornado idea came from a story they overheard on the radio about a tornado that hit a high school during their prom night. The episode would mark the departure of Eric Johnson as series star Whitney Fordman, though he would return as a special guest in seasons two and four.

=== Filming ===
Director Greg Beeman filmed the episode with a tone that was thematically similar to a "rising storm". According to Beeman, the episode would start very calm and then begin to build upon itself:

"I began with Lex being blasted by the wind from the helicopter landing as Lionel arrives to shut the plant down. I wanted to set the mood for the storm which was coming. Then everything settles down, and the show starts calmly, but then as it builds the camera starts to move more and circle more, until the storm arrives and it builds to this fever pitch. The whole episode had this steady, graceful arc to chaos, which I really tried to control".

The hard part of filming was controlling the buildup; Beeman wanted to build the drama, visuals, and the wind from the storm up together. Mike Walls brought in "jet-powered wind machines", which had been used for the film Twister, to simulate the high velocity winds for the storm that was going to blow through Smallville. The "wind" is first introduced when Chloe arrives to pick Clark up for the prom. What begins as a "gentle" introduction is built upon, little by little, with each progressing scene. By the time Lana drops Whitney off at the bus station, the wind has become very strong.

Another dilemma Beeman faced was keeping the performances realistic, and not "over-the-top". Beeman believes that "Tempest" proves exactly what he thought about Smallville, that the show is "seen and experienced from the point of view of a teenager". Beeman explains: "If you're in love, you're head over heels in love. If you're scared, you're terrified. If you're sad, you're in grief. The emotions are strong, but it doesn't mean that the performances are over-the-top".

From left to right: Tom Welling (Clark Kent), Allison Mack (Chloe Sullivan), and Sam Jones III (Pete Ross) with Remy Zero.

For "Tempest", this boils down to: the departure of Whitney, which causes distress in Lana; the experimental relationship between Clark and Chloe, who are trying to figure out whether or not "they'll be in love"; the evilness of Roger Nixon, and how Jonathan fights to protect his family; and the battle between father and son (Lionel and Lex). Beeman saw these events as if they were part of an opera, and that the performances needed to match that tone without going over-the-top.

Rob Maier, construction coordinator and production designer for "Tempest" was very busy for this episode, as scenes were filmed at the Andalinis farm, and Zero Avenue (which is the name of the road that runs along the Canada–United States border) for the scene where the three tornadoes touch down beside Lana. He also had to work on shattering the windows at the Luthor Mansion for Lex and Lionel's final confrontation. The band Remy Zero, whose single "Save Me" is the opening theme for the show, was asked to perform for the episode. The band quickly learned that filming a live performance for a television show is not as straight forward as its sounds. In order to be able to film everything, Beeman could not have the band playing full volume throughout the scene. There were times when everyone had to be quiet and pretend to play, or dance, while the actors exchanged their dialogue. There were other times when they had to be as loud as they could.

=== Effects ===
Mike Walsh was worried about filming the moment when a beam breaks inside the Luthor mansion, from the wind generated by the storm, and lands on top of Lionel. His crew already knew which beam was going to fall, but they did not know where to cut the beam because they were not sure how Beeman intended to shoot the scene. When the day of shooting came around everything worked out well. They used a stunt double for the initial impact of the beam, and then John Glover stepped back into the scene and fell down with the beam on top of him. The wind effects also created potential danger for the cast and crew. As Eric Johnson recalls, even the smallest piece of debris flying around at such high speeds can cause damage. Annette O'Toole had a similar experience for her scenes in the storm cellar. When Jonathan races into the storm after Nixon, the special effects crew used one of their jet fans and some dry leaves to simulate the winds that were coming from outside; the dry leaves were smacking O'Toole in the face, smothering her.

== Character development ==
This episode featured a lot of character development that many of the actors had been waiting for. Lana's jealousy over Clark and Chloe going to the prom begins to come out; Kristin Kreuk believes that Lana does not want to be jealous, and wants to be able to support Clark with his newfound feelings for Chloe. According to Eric Johnson, Whitney finally gets to show a side of himself that Johnson wishes the audience would have been able to see sooner, as Whitney gives Lana a private dance before the prom knowing that she will not be able to go because he is leaving town. To add further depth to his character not previously seen, Millar and Gough decided to send Whitney off to war, instead of killing the character outright. The idea of sending Whitney off to war was something that came to Millar and Gough midway through the season. They knew they did not want to kill him, because they wanted the ability to bring him back at some point in the future, so they came up with this "noble, heroic, send-off" for the character. For Lex, this episode featured the moment when he finally began to contemplate what his life would be like if his father was no longer a part of it. As Rosenbaum sees it, the moment that Lex hesitates to free his father from the support beam that collapses on him is the moment that the audience gets to see a hint of the evil man they know Lex will one day become. This is a brief moment where Lex forgets who he is, and if he had let his father die he would have certainly made his "turn to the dark side".

== Reception ==
"Tempest" premiered on The WB on May 21, 2002. "Tempest" achieved a Nielsen rating of 3.8, meaning that approximately 3.8 percent of all television-equipped households were tuned in to the episode, putting the episode 68th in viewership for the week of May 20–26. The episode went on to be nominated for two awards, although it did not win either. The first was a 2003 Golden Reel Award for "Best Sound Editing in Television Episodic". Attila Szalay also received a nomination by the Canadian Society of Cinematographers for his work.

Reviews for "Tempest" were mostly positive. The Futon Critic's Brian Ford Sullivan felt that the season finale gave every element the "four-star treatment", and that the cliffhanger ending was "riveting" enough to leave the reviewer in anticipation all summer long of the season two premiere. Sullivan would go on to rank "Tempest" as the fifteenth best television episode of 2002. Jonathan Boudreaux, a reviewer for TVDVDReviews.com, felt the episode was one of the season's strongest, thanks to the focus on characters, with "kryptonite taking a backseat"; he referred to "Tempest" as the "slam bang season ending cliffhanger". Eric Moro of Mania.com believed that "Tempest" proved Smallville could "utilize the supernatural as a metaphor for teenage life", and that the finale managed to "recap the theme of the entire season, brought every dangling plot point to a head and closed with an ending sure to bring viewers back for a second season of super-entertainment". Author Neal Bailey was little more mixed in his opinion. He felt that for all the episode accomplished, it was not better than any previous episode that had aired that season; the episode lacked anticipation, based on the predictability of each character's actions.

== Bibliography ==
- Simpson, Paul (2004). Smallville: The Official Companion Season 1. London: Titan Books. ISBN 1-84023-795-3.
