= Pilot (Smallville) =

- Smallville episode
- Clark is strung up as a scarecrow in the promotional poster for the premiere; this would lend to comparisons to Christ, as well as other character themes between Clark and Lex.
- Episode no.: Season 1 Episode 1
- Directed by: David Nutter
- Written by: Alfred Gough & Miles Millar
- Production code: 475165
- Original air date: October 16, 2001
- Running time: 50 minutes

Episode chronology
← Previous —	Next → "Metamorphosis"
- Smallville season 1

The pilot episode of the television series Smallville premiered on The WB on October 16, 2001. It was written by series developers Alfred Gough and Miles Millar, and directed by David Nutter. The Smallville pilot introduces the characters of Clark Kent, an orphaned alien with superhuman abilities, and his friends and family who live in the fictional town of Smallville, Kansas. It follows Clark as he first learns of his alien origins, and attempts to stop a vengeful student from killing Smallville High School students. The episode introduces many themes that were designed to run either the course of the season or the entire series, such as the triangular relationships of the main characters.

Production was set in Vancouver, Canada, used for its "middle America" landscape, with five months devoted to casting the right actors in the lead roles. Filming for the pilot officially began four days after the last actor was cast for the series. When time constraints would not allow the production crew to physically create the sets, computer-generated imagery was used to digitally insert set pieces into a scene. Due in large part to the pilot's significant visual effects budget, it cost $8 million to produce, a large amount for the time, and a then record for The WB. When the series premiere was broadcast, it broke several of The WB's viewership records. It was generally well received by critics, and was nominated for various awards, winning two.

== Plot ==
The episode begins in 1989 when a meteor shower hits Smallville; at the same time a small spacecraft, containing an alien boy, crashes in front of Jonathan and Martha Kent's (played by John Schneider and Annette O'Toole) truck. They adopt the superhumanly powerful child and name him Clark. Gough and Millar use this opening scene to establish that the three lead characters of the series, Clark, Lana and Lex, share a common bond—they are all without one or both parents: Clark is the only survivor of his homeworld; Lana's parents are killed in the meteor shower; and Lex is alienated from his father, Lionel Luthor (John Glover), after being rendered bald by the meteor blast.

The episode jumps forward twelve years to when Clark (Tom Welling) is trying to find his identity. He is unable to handle being told of his alien origins and runs away from home. Although he is attracted to Lana Lang (Kristin Kreuk), he cannot get close to her without falling over in pain because she wears a necklace made of meteor rock (kryptonite), which is a radioactive fragment of Clark's destroyed homeworld. This was a concept Gough and Millar devised to establish a reason for Clark's clumsiness. In other media, it is usually portrayed as an act he puts on to deceive people of his true identity. Clark and Lana do share an intimate moment at a cemetery, where Lana is visiting the grave of her parents. In such scenes, Gough and Millar created a theme of loneliness through the life stories of Clark and Lana. Lana's boyfriend, Whitney Fordman (Eric Johnson), becomes jealous of Clark and Lana's friendship and ties Clark to a scarecrow pole, using Lana's necklace, indirectly, to subdue Clark. This image of Clark, in just his underwear and a red "S" painted on his chest, stretches back to Gough and Millar's foundation for the series, which was about taking Clark down to the basic elements of the Superman character.

In the second strand of the story, Lex Luthor (Michael Rosenbaum) and Clark develop a "yin and yang" relationship. Clark first saves Lex from drowning when they get into a car accident; at the end of the episode, Lex saves Clark when he is strung up in the cornfield and immobilized by kryptonite. Jeremy Creek (Adrian McMorran)—who was mutated by the meteor rocks, gaining special powers—puts the three former jocks, who tied him to a scarecrow pole during the meteor shower, into comas. He sets out to kill everyone attending the school's dance, after witnessing Clark experience the same hazing he did, but Clark is able to arrive in time to stop him.

== Production ==
=== Casting ===
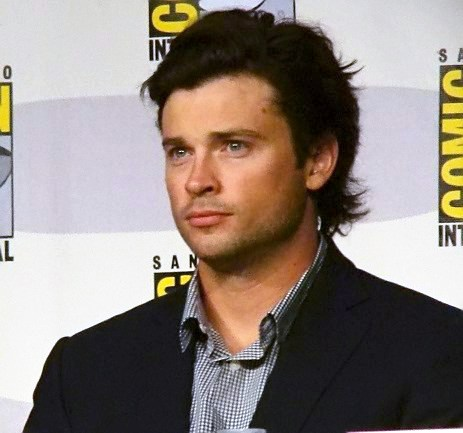
Tom Welling (pictured in 2010) twice refused the role of Clark Kent before testing for it.

Gough and Millar had five months for casting, but their primary focus was on finding an actor to play Clark Kent. They received Kristin Kreuk's audition tape for the role of Lana Lang and liked it so much that they immediately showed her to the network. Tom Welling, after twice turning down the producers' attempts to get him to audition for the role of Clark Kent, eventually accepted the opportunity to be part of the show. It was David Nutter who finally convinced Welling to read the script for the pilot, after finding Welling's picture in a photo album at the casting director's office. Welling's manager did not want him to take the role because it could hurt his feature film career, but Welling liked the script and agreed to come in for an audition. Welling's reason for turning down the role was because the producers were keeping quiet on what the show was really about, which left him with the impression the show was going to be "Superman in high school", something he did not want to do. Nutter promised to let Welling read the script if he came in and auditioned. After auditioning, Welling was given the script to read, which he thought was "amazing". For one of his auditions, he read the graveyard scene, from the pilot, with Kristin Kreuk; the network thought they had "great chemistry". No one could agree on which actors had the best audition for Lex Luthor. Michael Rosenbaum auditioned twice, and, believing he did not take his first audition seriously, outlined a two-and-a-half-page scene from the pilot. He indicated all the places to be funny, charismatic, or menacing, and performed so well that everyone agreed he was "the guy".

John Schneider was brought in to play Jonathan Kent. Schneider was already well known as Bo Duke from The Dukes of Hazzard, and Gough believed Schneider's experience from The Dukes of Hazzard added believability to the idea that he could have grown up running a farm. Cynthia Ettinger was originally cast as Martha Kent, but during filming it was generally agreed—Ettinger included—that she was not right for the role. Annette O'Toole, who previously portrayed Lana Lang in Superman III, and who was fresh off the recent cancellation of her television series The Huntress, was cast in Ettinger's place, reshooting the scenes Ettinger had filmed.

Eric Johnson, after auditioning for the roles of Lex and Clark, was cast as Lana Lang's boyfriend Whitney Fordman. Johnson only spent one day filming his scenes for the pilot. Allison Mack toyed with the idea of auditioning for the role of Lana Lang but chose instead to audition for the role of Chloe Sullivan. The character was created just for the series and was intended to add ethnic diversity to the cast, but part of the reason Gough and Millar chose to cast Mack, against their initial intentions to give the character an ethnic background, was because they were impressed with Allison Mack's "rare ability to deliver large chunks of expositionary [sic] dialogue conversationally". Sam Jones III, who plays Pete Ross, was the last of the series regulars to be cast. Gough and Millar saw Jones four days before they began filming for the pilot. In the comics, Pete Ross is Caucasian, and the producers chose to cast Jones, who is African-American, against the mythology.

=== Filming ===
Once Warner Bros. Television secured the rights to the show, Gough and Millar set out to write the script and find a director for the pilot. Gough and Millar were fans of director David Nutter's previous work; they considered him to be a "preeminent pilot director". David Nutter joined the project because he wanted to make a pilot that respected the audience but that was still fun and smart. Nutter also believes in creating shows that appeal to a wide variety of audiences. He wanted the final scene for the pilot, in which Clark fantasizes about dancing with Lana, to express the show's essence. According to Welling: "It brings them close—not as close as Clark would like, but at the end of [this] episode, he imagines that he's with her and can really see it happening".

Production was initially slated to take place in Australia, but Vancouver, British Columbia, Canada had more of the "middle America" feel for which the creators were looking. The area offered a site for the Kent farm, including their barn, and the city itself doubled as Metropolis. Vancouver provided a cheaper shooting location, and was in the same time zone as Los Angeles. Filming began in March 2001; Nutter spent sixteen days on main unit filming and an additional five days for second unit filming. Time constraints forced Nutter to film strictly from Adrien Van Viersen's 150–page storyboard when filming the opening meteor shower scene. Much of the look for Smallville came from Millar, who wanted the epitome of "Smalltown, USA". Construction coordinator Rob Maier explained: "It had to be cleaner than clean, nicer than nice, more beautiful than it would be in the real world. All of the people in Smallville are beautiful; all of the colors are bright and sharp". For the Kent farm, Nutter wanted to have "an old world sensibility and tone". For the pilot, the production crew only built a kitchen and dining room to represent the Kent home. All the exterior shots of the farm were taken at the Andalinis farm, owned by a local couple who also gave the crew permission to paint their forest green house yellow. Since the Vancouver farm already had a barn, the production crew only had to build a loft with stairs leading up to it.

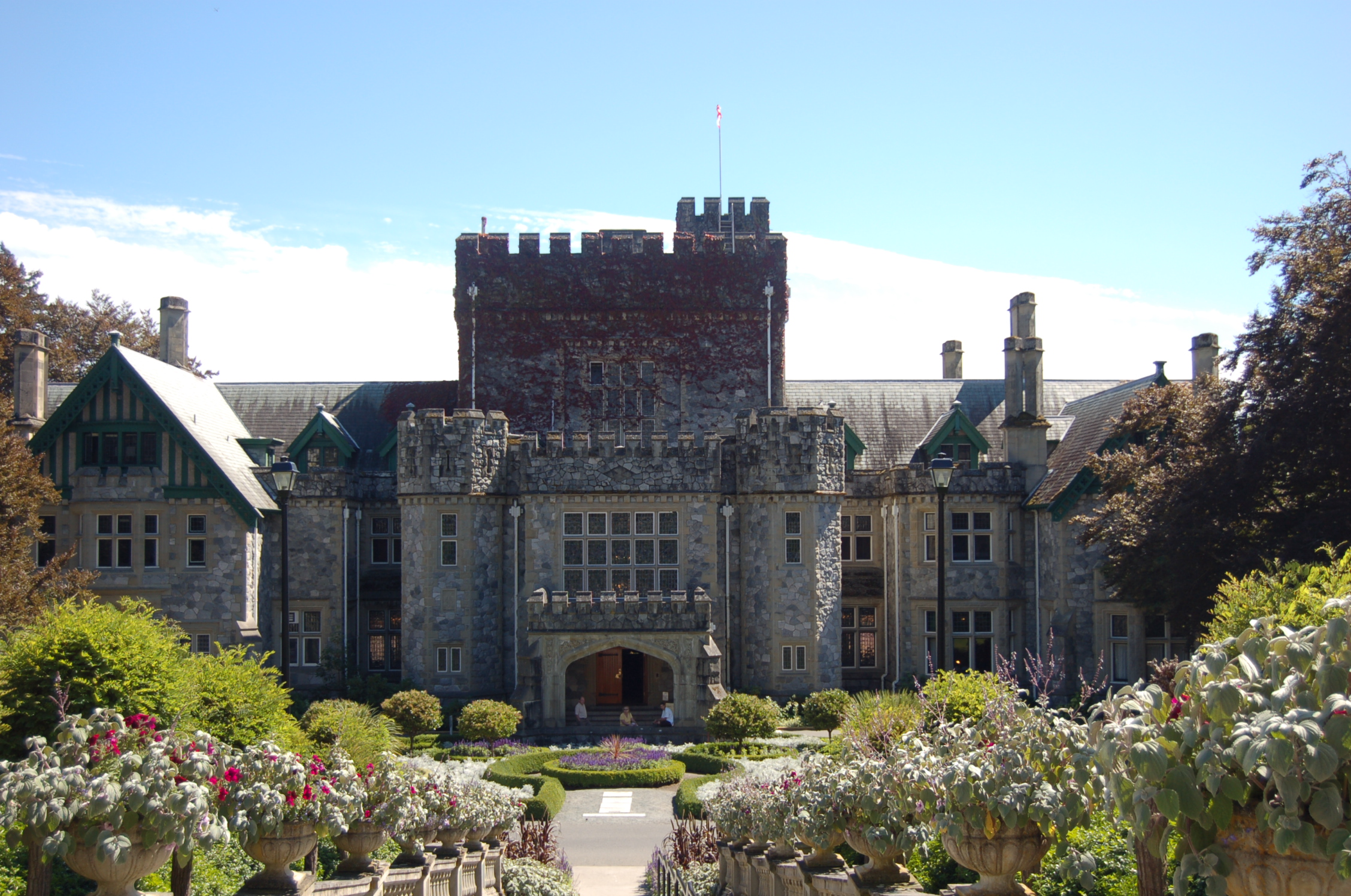
Hatley Castle provides the outside look of the Luthor ancestral home, but the interior was shot at Shannon Mews, in Vancouver.

Exterior shots of the Luthor Mansion were shot at the Hatley Castle in Victoria, two hours west of Vancouver by ferry. Time constraints forced scenes, which were shot from multiple angles, to sometimes be shot at separate locations. A scene involving Whitney (Eric Johnson) and Lana (Kristin Kreuk) sitting on her porch was shot at two different locations. Close-ups of Whitney were shot under a football stadium, while close-ups of Lana were shot in a potato-processing factory. Unable to shoot at the house being used as the Lang residence, the crew built Lana's front porch inside a sewage processing facility for the final scene of the episode where Lana walks up the stairs to her house. The local sewage treatment facility is also the site for the LuthorCorp pesticide plant, which Lex was sent to Smallville to manage. The crash site of Clark's ship was shot at the sandpits where Mission to Mars was filmed. Smallville's Main Street was filmed in both the town of Merritt, which is three hours east of Vancouver, and in the town of Cloverdale. Most of the filming took place in Cloverdale, since the town had a long stretch of vacant buildings that could double as Smallville's Main Street. When the production crew came to film the opening teaser, they had to decorate the town with ribbons and balloons, as well as paint some of the buildings to attain Millar's idea of "Smalltown, USA". Two sets were built just for the pilot. The Kent storm cellar was built as a cover set inside the farm's barn. For the cemetery scene between Clark and Lana, production designer Bernard Hides built the entire cemetery from scratch in an empty field.

=== Effects ===
On-set computer-generated effects for the pilot were done by Thomas Special Effects. Certain scenes, because of time and money, had to be created digitally. The opening sequence showing the destruction of the water tower by a meteor was created on the computer. A persistent problem during production was the lack of cornfields. As realistic corn was a necessity for a show based in Kansas, this became a problem for the filmmakers. Over 10,000 stalks of corn were grown in a greenhouse for the pilot, but they only grew two feet high, which was not usable to the crew. The day the crew was filming the scene for Clark's landing there were no cornfields in the surrounding area. The cornfields had to be digitally added. Digital corn was a common substitute for the undersized corn that was grown, but for scenes where digital corn was not an option, six hundred stalks of fake corn were flown in from a manufacturer in Arizona. Other digital effects include the flattened cornfield where Lex was caught in a meteorite blast. Some scenes required physical effects, instead of computer imagery. When Lex drives his car off a bridge and hits Clark, the stunt performer, who doubled as Wolverine in the film X-Men, was literally hit by the car as it went over the bridge.

== Release and reception ==
"Pilot" premiered on The WB on October 16, 2001. 8.4 million viewers watched the pilot's debut, breaking The WB's record for highest ratings for a new series. The pilot broke The WB's ratings record for the 18–49 male demographic, with 3.9 million viewers; it became the third-highest rated debut for the overall adult 18–49 demographic, with an average 3.8 million viewers. The premiere also finished first with viewers age 12–34, leading Warner Bros. President of Entertainment Jordan Levin to credit the series with invigorating the network's Tuesday night lineup. The pilot won an Emmy Award for Sound Editing; it had also been nominated for Visual Effects but lost to UPN's Star Trek: Enterprise. The special effects team won a Leo Award for Best Visual Effects in a Dramatic Series. Casting directors Deedee Bradley, Coreen Mayrs, and Barbara Miller were nominated for an Artios Award for their work on the pilot. The pilot was nominated for two Golden Reel Awards, one for Effects & Foley Sound Editing and one for Music Sound Editing. Peter Wunstorf was also nominated for an American Society of Cinematographers Award for his work on the pilot. The pilot, along with the second episode "Metamorphosis", was released in Canada as a special pilot film. The episodes were altered on the DVD, formatted in 1.78 widescreen, and presented with no opening segment and an alternate closing. It also contained the same special features present in the DVD box set of the first season. The DVD was released in a snap case.

The pilot received favorable reviews upon its release. Rob Owen of the Pittsburgh Post-Gazette thought it was a "respectful addition to Superman lore" and had "all the markings of a super series". Owen noted the Christ-like imagery of the scene, stating, "is it any wonder Clark gets tied up there since Superman, too, was 'sent to save us'?" Echoing Owen, DVD Verdict noted the same symbolism:

Superman is, in a way, the secular pop culture stand-in for Jesus Christ, a messiah figure for our generation. The series makes this theme explicit in its pilot episode, in which Clark is symbolically 'crucified' in a cornfield. That striking bit of symbolism becomes the central preoccupation of the series; Clark is the savior who sacrifices all for the greater good of humanity, and Smallville shows us how he comes to accept and embrace that role.

Elizabeth White of Media Life believed the show had potential to be a big hit for The WB but felt it needed to survive not only its time slot—Tuesdays at 9:00 p.m. (EST)—but also the audience's expectations of "what Superman should be". USA Today's Robert Bianco was a bit more mixed in his criticism. Bianco stated: "For all its innovations, there's also something rehashed and repetitive about Smallville... shows often look more familiar at the outset than they do as they progress. There's talent and intelligence at work in Smallville. Given time, maybe they'll find a more distinctive voice". Jeremy Conrad, from IGN, swore to himself that he would never watch Smallville, because he was a "huge Superman fan" and he did not like the idea the creators would be making changes to the Superman mythology. After viewing the pilot, Conrad said: "It's a very solid start to the series, and one of the better pilot episodes I've seen in a while". In The Futon Critic's 50 best episodes of 2001 rankings, the pilot was placed 31st, with Brian Ford Sullivan stating that "Smallville opened us to a surprisingly fresh take on the Superman myth-this time showing us the humble beginnings of a young Clark Kent".

The CW re-aired the pilot on Friday, April 8, 2011, in preparation for the series finale. The episode was watched by 1.55 million viewers and achieved a 0.5 Adults 18-49 rating, despite only 92% coverage.

== See also ==
- Pilot (Arrow), a pilot episode of Green Arrow-based series, filmed in same location and with same director.
- Aquaman, a pilot for Aquaman, developed by the same individuals who developed Smallville.
- List of television series based on DC Comics publications

== Bibliography ==
- Simpson, Paul (2004). Smallville: The Official Companion Season 1. London: Titan Books. ISBN 1-84023-795-3.
