= Smallville season 4 =

Season of television series

Smallville
- Season 4
- DVD cover featuring Tom Welling and recurring guest star Erica Durance
- Showrunners: Alfred Gough; Miles Millar
- Starring: Tom Welling; Kristin Kreuk; Michael Rosenbaum; Jensen Ackles; Allison Mack; John Glover; Annette O'Toole; John Schneider
- No. of episodes: 22

Release
- Original network: The WB
- Original release: September 22, 2004 – May 18, 2005

Season chronology
- ← Previous; Season 3 Next → Season 5

The fourth season of Smallville, an American television series developed by Alfred Gough and Miles Millar, began airing on September 22, 2004 on The WB television network. The series recounts the early adventures of Kryptonian Clark Kent as he adjusts to life in the fictional town of Smallville, Kansas, during the years before he becomes Superman. The fourth season comprises 22 episodes and concluded its initial airing on May 18, 2005. Regular cast members during season four include Tom Welling, Kristin Kreuk, Michael Rosenbaum, Jensen Ackles, Allison Mack, John Glover, Annette O'Toole, and John Schneider.

Season four chronicles Clark (Welling) and his classmates' senior year of high school and centers on his attempt to unite the three stones of knowledge, and trying to cope with Lana Lang's (Kreuk) new relationship with Jason Teague (Ackles). Clark's friendship with Lex Luthor (Rosenbaum) becomes increasingly strained, as he begins to distrust Lex more and more. At the end of season three, Sam Jones III, who portrayed Pete Ross, left the series, and Ackles was brought in as Jason and given star billing. Erica Durance was cast as Lois Lane, and became a recurring character for 13 episodes. Writers also brought in other popular DC Comics characters, such as Bart Allen, Mister Mxyzptlk, and Sam and Lucy Lane.

Smallville's season four slipped in the ratings, averaging at 4.4 million viewers a week.

== Episodes ==
No. overall	No. in season	Title	Directed by	Written by	Original release date	Prod. code	U.S. viewers (millions)
67	1	"Crusade"	Greg Beeman	Alfred Gough & Miles Millar	September 22, 2004	2T5201	6.07
Clark returns to Smallville as Kal-El; intent on fulfilling his destiny, Kal-El takes to the skies to steal a powerful Kryptonian stone which was in the possession of Lex. Dr. Virgil Swann's emissary Bridgette Crosby (Margot Kidder) arrives to help Martha, who learns about a new form of kryptonite called Black Kryptonite. Lois Lane (Erica Durance) comes to town to investigate the death of her cousin Chloe. Lana is in Paris with a new boyfriend, Jason Teague, and Jonathan lies in a coma. Martha uses the Black Kryptonite to help Clark retrieve his past self. Lana sees a symbol on her back which is similar to one on the tombstone of Countess Margaret Isobel Thoreaux.
68	2	"Gone"	James Marshall	Kelly Souders & Brian Peterson	September 29, 2004	2T5202	5.66
Clark and Lois investigate Chloe's apparent death, but are stopped by Lois's father General Sam Lane (Michael Ironside). Lois suspects he knows more about Chloe's death than he is letting on, and tries to find out more. Discovering that Lex has been keeping her in hiding, Clark tries to find Chloe before Lionel's assassin, the metal-morphing Trent MacGowan (James Bell), can really kill her.
69	3	"Façade"	Pat Williams	Holly Harold	October 6, 2004	2T5204	5.45
Jason, having followed Lana to Smallville, takes a position as the assistant football coach. The two try keeping their romance a secret from the school and Clark. Abby Fine (Brianna Brown), a student with a bad case of acne, turns to plastic surgery at the hands of her mother Dr. Elise Brown (Julianne Christie) to enhance her looks and boost her popularity. Things go awry when she discovers that her kryptonite-enhanced beauty causes harm to anyone she kisses. Lois finds out what happened and is nearly put through the same experiments by Brown before Clark timely intervenes.
70	4	"Devoted"	David Carson	Luke Schelhaas	October 13, 2004	2T5203	6.20
The cheerleading squad consisting of Mandy (Amanda Walsh), Mara (Moneca Delain), Mary (Lisa Marie Caruk), and Rhonda (Chelane Simmons) spike the football player's drinks with a kryptonite-enhanced love potion. The result allows Clark to become the starting quarterback for the school. It also causes Chloe to passionately kiss Clark and sends a jealous Jason after Clark. Clark and Lois investigate and uncover the truth, and the key to removing the trance. With the information found by Lois, Clark causes extreme heat to bust open the steam pipes in order to negate the love potions.
71	5	"Run"	David Barrett	Steven S. DeKnight	October 20, 2004	2T5205	5.41
Clark attempts to track down Bart Allen (Kyle Gallner), a thief who stole Jonathan's wallet, but he is faster than Clark. Later, Bart arrives at the farm to make amends. Lex buys a manuscript with Kryptonian symbols, and Clark discovers that it contains a hidden map to one of the Kryptonian stones. When Bart steals the manuscript, he inadvertently puts Clark's life in danger and must make the decision to save Clark or himself.
72	6	"Transference"	James Marshall	Todd Slavkin & Darren Swimmer	October 27, 2004	2T5206	5.69
One of the stones begins calling to Clark, who speeds to the prison where Lionel is held. When he sees Lionel attempt to stab Lex with the stone, Clark grabs for it, causing the two men to switch bodies. Learning his new body has super powers, Lionel immediately begins wreaking havoc in Smallville. Trapped behind bars without his powers, Clark tries to figure out a way to get his body and powers back in order to save his friends and family.
73	7	"Jinx"	Paul Shapiro	Mark Warshaw	November 3, 2004	2T5207	5.02
Foreign-exchange student Mikhail Mxyzptlk (Trent Ford) has the power of persuasion, and uses it to fix sporting events. Clark and Chloe try to figure out how he is controlling everyone. Mikhail makes a bet with Lex to keep his citizenship, but Clark and Chloe discover his weakness, preventing him from controlling the game. With his powers lost, Mikhail surrenders to Lex, but Lex decides to take him to a secret LuthorCorp lab, 33.1, where he hopes Mikhail will regain his ability.
74	8	"Spell"	Jeannot Szwarc	Steven S. DeKnight	November 10, 2004	2T5208	5.51
In France during the 1600s, Margaret Isobel Thoreaux (Kreuk in a dual role) and her fellow witches Madelyn Hibbins (Lara Gilchrist) and Brianna Withridge (Melanie Papalia) are burned at the stake. After Lana reads from a spell book, she becomes possessed by the spirit Isobel; Chloe and Lois also become possessed by the ghosts of Madelyn and Brianna. The three witches seek revenge for their burning, as well as the Kryptonian stones. Clark attempts to stop the witches, but they strip him of his powers, shackle and torture him, and force him to reveal the location of the stone he hid in the cave. Eventually, however, Clark is freed by Jason and confronts the witches in the cave. There, he regains his powers and uses his heat-vision to destroy the spell book and free Lana, Lois, and Chloe from possession.
75	9	"Bound"	Terrence O'Hara	Luke Schelhaas	November 17, 2004	2T5209	5.06
Lex is accused of killing a young woman (Cobie Smulders) and Clark sets out to prove his innocence. Swearing he is a changed man, Lionel offers Clark insight into the crime, but he asks for something in return. Meanwhile, Lana meets Jason's mother Genevieve (Jane Seymour) and has a vivid flashback of the day Isobel, Madelyn, and Brianna were burned at the stake, leading her to suspect that Jason's mother was there when she got her tattoo.
76	10	"Scare"	David Carson	Kelly Souders & Brian Peterson	December 1, 2004	2T5210	4.89
Lex's secret experiment at LuthorCorp goes awry and causes a dangerous toxin to be released into Smallville. Those infected by the toxin, including Jonathan, Martha, Lana, Chloe, Lex, and Jason, imagine their greatest fears come true and then fall into a coma. Desperate to find a cure, Clark heats up the vials containing a cure while Lex is not looking. With the cure heated to the correct temperature, Lex does something unexpected with the unproven antidote.
77	11	"Unsafe"	Greg Beeman	Steven S. DeKnight & Jeph Loeb	January 26, 2005	2T5211	4.21
Claiming to be cured, Alicia Baker (Sarah Carter) is released from Belle Reve and returns to Smallville. Initially skeptical of Alicia, Clark finds himself enjoying a relationship with someone who knows his secret. When she pushes for more, he hesitates, causing her to use red kryptonite to remove his inhibitions. A morally-challenged Clark emerges and whisks Alicia off to get married. Lana attempts to have sex with Jason in an effort to win him back.
78	12	"Pariah"	Paul Shapiro	Holly Harold	February 2, 2005	2T5212	4.78
Clark has concerns after Alicia becomes the prime suspect in a brutal attack against Lana and Jason. Initially defending Alicia, Clark begins to think differently as the evidence begins to pile up. Hurt, Alicia tricks Clark into unknowingly revealing his powers to Chloe. Afterward, Clark finds Alicia murdered by the sand-powered Tim Westcott (Derek Hamilton) who is truly responsible for the attacks. Clark is deeply affected, as he held strong feelings for her. Genevieve returns to town with an offer for Lex.
79	13	"Recruit"	Jeannot Szwarc	Todd Slavkin & Darren Swimmer	February 9, 2005	2T5213	4.91
In an effort to recruit Clark for their football team, Metropolis University sends their star player Geoff Johns (Chris Carmack) to show Clark the perks of attending Met U. After one of Metropolis University's players dies under mysterious circumstances, and Lois is arrested for his murder due to a previous altercation with him, Clark discovers that Geoff has super powers and is using them to paralyze anyone who gets in his way, including Lois. Clark subdues Geoff and rescues Lois who is then cleared of all charges. Meanwhile, Chloe attempts to learn more about Clark's secret.
80	14	"Krypto"	James Marshall	Luke Schelhaas	February 16, 2005	2T5214	5.08
While driving, Lois accidentally hits a dog and brings it back to the farm. Clark realizes it is not an ordinary dog when it drags a tractor across the lawn. Clark and Lois learn the dog was stolen from an aborted LuthorCorp experiment and was now being used by two brothers (Diego Klattenhoff and Nolan Gerard Funk) to commit crimes. Lex lets Clark keep the dog, whom Martha named Shelby. Meanwhile, Lana questions Jason's involvement in his mother's schemes.
81	15	"Sacred"	Brad Turner	Kelly Souders & Brian Peterson	February 23, 2005	2T5215	5.26
After learning that Jason and Lex are in Shanghai searching for one of the Kryptonian stones, Clark and Lana follow in the hopes of finding it first. Clark finds an artifact that leads them to the stone, but he must battle Isobel, the witch who possessed Lana, who has returned to take the stone for herself. Lex has more information on the stones than he is letting on.
82	16	"Lucy"	David Barrett	Story by : Neil Sadhu; Teleplay by : Neil Sadhu & Daniel Sulzberg	March 2, 2005	2T5216	4.51
Lois's younger sister, Lucy (Peyton List), comes to town and charms everyone she meets. Clark discovers a darker side to Lucy, after he catches her stealing money from the Talon, and forces her to reveal the truth about her sudden appearance in Smallville. Meanwhile, the stone from Shanghai disappears from Lana's apartment and Jason accuses Lionel of stealing it.
83	17	"Onyx"	Terrence O'Hara	Steven S. DeKnight	April 13, 2005	2T5217	3.85
A glimpse of the future Lex is revealed after a kryptonite explosion splits him in two: the good Alexander and his evil side Lex. Lex immediately imprisons Alexander in the mansion, and tries to kill Clark and Chloe. After discovering Clark's secret, he attempts to persuade Clark to join him. Clark uses black kryptonite to force the two Lexes back together.
84	18	"Spirit"	Whitney Ransick	Luke Schelhaas	April 20, 2005	2T5218	4.39
A stunned Chloe is nominated for Prom Queen, and tries to talk a reluctant Clark and Lana into attending the dance with her that Lifehouse will be performing at. After Chloe's snobbish rival Dawn Stiles (Beatrice Rosen) crashes her own car into a ravine filled with kryptonite, Dawn's ghost is released, allowing her to commandeer the body of anyone she comes into contact with. With this ability she has Lana ask Clark to be her date, gets Lois to attend the prom, and forces Chloe to attempt to set the school on fire. When she possesses Clark, Jonathan shows up with kryptonite per Clark's warning, which exorcises Dawn.
85	19	"Blank"	Jeannot Szwarc	Kelly Souders & Brian Peterson	April 27, 2005	2T5219	4.59
Kevin Grady (Jonathan Bennett), a boy who can cause people to lose their recent memory, turns his powers on Clark and causes him to have total amnesia. Chloe discovers what has happened and must teach Clark about his superpowers while simultaneously trying to keep him from accidentally revealing them to others, leading her to get captured by Kevin's father Dr. Lawrence Grady (Tom Butler). Without his memory, Clark meets and falls in love with Lana again. Lex takes advantage and convinces Clark to reveal the cave secrets. When Clark regains his memory (minus the days he had amnesia) and rescues Chloe from Dr. Grady, Lois and Sheriff Nancy Adams (Camille Mitchell) show up to witness Clark's super-strength. Kevin erases the memories of Lois, Adams, and Chloe. Dr. Grady is arrested as Kevin takes his leave.
86	20	"Ageless"	Steven S. DeKnight	Steven S. DeKnight	May 4, 2005	2T5220	4.51
Clark and Lana discover an abandoned baby (Owen and Elizabeth Stewart) in the cornfield and take him back to the Kent farm, but once the baby ages from a newborn to a seven-year-old (Colin Ford) to a sixteen-year-old (Jeffrey Ballard) in a matter of days, the two realize he is aging at a rapid rate and frantically search for a cure before the disease kills him.
87	21	"Forever"	James Marshall	Brian Peterson & Kelly Souders	May 11, 2005	2T5221	3.96
Clark must stop the school photographer Brendan Nash (Steven Grayhm) after he sets up a secret simulated high school and begins kidnapping students to keep the glory days of high school going forever. Clark finds that Brendan can freeze anyone with his touch, trapping them as a wax sculpture. When Brendan tries to do the same thing to Clark, it turns against Brendan causing him to turn to wax himself. After he falls and shatters, the others he had frozen in wax become freed. Lex and Lionel are kidnapped and tortured by the Teagues in an effort to find the Kryptonian stone, but after Genevieve realizes Lana has it, she decides to put an end to the hunt once and for all. Lex and Lionel escape and Lionel seemingly kills Jason before he can reveal a secret to Lex. Jonathan attempts to convince Clark to pursue a life away from the farm.
88	22	"Commencement"	Greg Beeman	Todd Slavkin & Darren Swimmer	May 18, 2005	2T5222	5.47
Genevieve confronts Lana, but Isobel takes control and kills Genevieve, subsequently releasing Lana from possession. As a result of using a Kryptonian stone to kill a person, a menace comes to Smallville, under the guise of a second meteor shower that threatens the town, and Clark is forced to listen to Jor-El (voiced by Terence Stamp) and retrieve all of the stones at once. As Jonathan and Martha prepare to evacuate, Jason arrives and holds them at gunpoint demanding to know where Clark is so he can find the stones, but a meteor crashes into the house, burying them all in rubble. Clark races across town to retrieve the Kryptonian stones and puts them all together in the cave. Lex forces Chloe to accompany him to the caves where they see Clark standing in a blinding light. Lana's helicopter crashes next to a newly arrived spaceship, and Clark is transported to the Arctic.

== Cast and characters ==
=== Main ===
- Tom Welling as Clark Kent
- Kristin Kreuk as Lana Lang
  - Kreuk also portrays Countess Margaret Isobel Thoreaux in three episodes
- Michael Rosenbaum as Lex Luthor
- Jensen Ackles as Jason Teague (Note: Absent in two episodes)
- Allison Mack as Chloe Sullivan (Note: Absent in one episode)
- John Glover as Lionel Luthor (Note: Absent in nine episodes)
- Annette O'Toole as Martha Kent
- John Schneider as Jonathan Kent

=== Recurring ===
- Erica Durance as Lois Lane
- Camille Mitchell as Sheriff Nancy Adams
- Jane Seymour as Genevieve Teague

== Awards ==
The fourth season garnered Leo Awards. Make-up artist Natalie Cosco was awarded the Leo Award for Best Make-Up, for her work on the episode "Scare". In 2006, Barry Donlevy took home Best Cinematography in a Dramatic Series for his work on "Spirit", while David Wilson won Best Production Design in a Dramatic Series for "Sacred". The series was recognized by the Visual Effects Society with a nomination in the 2005 VES Awards and 2006 VES Awards. The 2005 nomination was for Outstanding Created Environment for "Crusade", while the 2006 nomination was for Outstanding Visual Effects in the episode "Commencement". The show received Teen Choice Award nominations in 2005 for Choice TV Actor (Welling), Choice Parental Units (Schneider and O'Toole), and Choice Sidekick (Mack). In 2005, the show was nominated for a Golden Reel Award for Best Sound Editing in "Scare". In 2005, "Commencement" was nominated for an Outstanding Sound Editing Emmy Award. Glen Winter's cinematography work was recognized with an American Society of Cinematographers Award for "Sacred". For the 31st Annual Saturn Awards, Welling received a nomination for Best Actor, Rosenbaum and Erica Durance received nominations for Best Supporting Actor/Actress, and the fourth season was nominated for Best Network Television Series.

== Home media release ==
The complete fourth season of Smallville was released on September 13, 2005, in North America. Additional releases in region 2 and region 4 took place on October 10, 2005, and November 11, 2006, respectively. The DVD box set included various special features, including episode commentary, a behind-the-scenes featurette on the writers, a featurette on the different actress who have portrayed Lois Lane over the years, and DVD-ROM linking to Smallville websites. For the 20th anniversary, the complete series was released for the first time on Blu-ray on October 16, 2021. The Blu-ray release marks the first time when season 4 was released in its native high-definition resolution.
