= Smallville season 5 =

Season of television series

Smallville
- Season 5
- DVD cover featuring Tom Welling and Michael Rosenbaum
- Showrunners: Alfred Gough; Miles Millar
- Starring: Tom Welling; Kristin Kreuk; Michael Rosenbaum; Erica Durance; Allison Mack; John Glover; Annette O'Toole; John Schneider
- No. of episodes: 22

Release
- Original network: The WB
- Original release: September 29, 2005 – May 11, 2006

Season chronology
- ← Previous; Season 4 Next → Season 6

The fifth season of Smallville, an American television series developed by Alfred Gough and Miles Millar, began airing on September 29, 2005 on The WB television network. The series recounts the early adventures of Kryptonian Clark Kent as he adjusts to life in the fictional town of Smallville, Kansas, during the years before he becomes Superman. The fifth season comprises 22 episodes and concluded its initial airing on May 11, 2006. Regular cast members during season five include Tom Welling, Kristin Kreuk, Michael Rosenbaum, Erica Durance, Allison Mack, John Glover, Annette O'Toole, and John Schneider. Durance was promoted after having a recurring role in season four.

Season five deals with the aftermath of the second meteor shower. Clark (Welling) deals with adult life, going to college, a real relationship with Lana Lang (Kreuk), and the loss of someone he loves. His distrust for Lex Luthor (Rosenbaum) continues to grow, as Clark's professor begins supplying him with evidence of LuthorCorp's secret projects. Clark looks to Chloe Sullivan (Mack) for support, while Lionel Luthor's (Glover) transformation into a better person draws skepticism from everyone. Jensen Ackles, who played Jason Teague in season four, left the show. The writers also brought in Arthur Curry, Victor Stone, and Andrea Rojas, DC Comics superheroes, in three separate guest spots as well as the classic Superman villain Brainiac.

After spending seasons three and four airing on Wednesday at 8:00 pm (ET), Smallville was moved to Thursday at 8:00 pm, where it stayed for four seasons. Season five rose from the previous season, averaging 4.7 million viewers weekly. This was the last season to air on The WB. From season six onwards, the series aired on The CW, following a merger of The WB and UPN networks.

== Episodes ==
No. overall	No. in season	Title	Directed by	Written by	Original release date	Prod. code	U.S. viewers (millions)
89	1	"Arrival"	James Marshall	Todd Slavkin & Darren Swimmer	September 29, 2005	2T6401	5.90
Transported to the Arctic, Clark watches as the united crystals create the Fortress of Solitude. Inside, Jor-El (voiced by Terence Stamp) instructs Clark that he must complete training for an impending doom that is about to hit Earth. Lana tells Lex about the spaceship; he dismisses her and transports the ship to LuthorCorp. A mysterious man, Milton Fine (James Marsters), comes out of it. Chloe is transported to the Arctic with Clark. Ultimately, Clark has to save her life and he reveals to her he is an alien. Meanwhile, two Kryptonian disciples of Zod named Aethyr (Alana de la Garza) and Nam-Ek (Leonard Roberts) arrive in Smallville searching for Kal-El. To end their destruction, Clark is forced to face them before completing his training, but promises Jor-El that he will return before sunset. Clark sends the disciples to the Phantom Zone but misses the deadline for returning to Jor-El. Lex confronts Chloe about what she knows. Lana is given a newspaper stating that the Teagues perished in the meteor shower with a note from Lex stating that he took care of the incident.
90	2	"Mortal"	Terrence O'Hara	Steven S. DeKnight	October 6, 2005	2T6402	5.84
For not returning as promised, Jor-El strips Clark of his powers, making him normal. Delighted to finally be "human", Clark pursues a relationship with Lana without secrets. Lana's distrust in Lex grows due to his lies to her about the ship. When Lana, Jonathan and Martha are taken hostage by the electricity-harnessing Tommy Lee (Kenneth Johnson) and the force field-generating Twins (Todd and Brad Mann), Clark must figure out how to save his family without his superpowers. In the end, Clark learns that everything was orchestrated by Lex, in an effort to test Clark's abilities. Clark has a violent confrontation with Lex, thus ending their friendship. Clark and Lana consummate their relationship for the first time, growing closer.
91	3	"Hidden"	Whitney Ransick	Kelly Souders & Brian Peterson	October 13, 2005	2T6403	5.92
Chloe is warned by Gabriel Duncan (Johnny Lewis), a former school newspaper worker, that he is going to set off a missile and obliterate all of Smallville. Still stripped of his superpowers, Clark confronts Gabriel and is shot. Shortly after, he dies with Lana by his side. Jor-El possesses Lionel's body and resurrects Clark and restores all his powers, but with the consequence that someone Clark loves will have to die. Jor-El tells Clark that Lionel became a vessel of information for him to use. Clark stops the missile and reunites with his parents and Lana. Lex's suspicion of Clark grows as he tells Lana that Clark is lying and not normal. Chloe advises Clark not to lie to Lana.
92	4	"Aqua"	Bradford May	Todd Slavkin & Darren Swimmer	October 20, 2005	2T6406	6.40
Lois injures herself while diving in the lake, but before Clark can reach her, a mysterious swimmer, Arthur Curry (Alan Ritchson), out-swims Clark and rescues her first. Clark attends his first class at Central Kansas A&M University and Fine, his professor, tells him that Lex is behind a covert operation manufacturing weapons. The same weapons are what brought Arthur to Smallville. Teaming up with Clark, the two destroy Lex's underwater weapon Leviathan and Clark's trust in Lex disappears completely. Clark decides to work with Fine to research the destruction of LuthorCorp.
93	5	"Thirst"	Paul Shapiro	Steven S. DeKnight	October 27, 2005	2T6404	5.78
Lana decides to enroll at Metropolis University at the last minute and is forced to join a sorority to find housing. The house leader Buffy Sanders (Brooke Nevin) and her sorority sisters offer her more than a place to crash when they turn her into a vampire. Buffy got her vampiric abilities after being bitten by a kryptonite-infected bat. Lex provides Clark with an antidote for Lana after LuthorCorp is revealed to be connected to the vampires. Chloe earns an internship at the Daily Planet. Fine's arm turns into a knife and he kills a guard at LuthorCorp who was protecting his spaceship.
94	6	"Exposed"	Jeannot Szwarc	Kelly Souders & Brian Peterson	November 3, 2005	2T6405	5.41
Senator Jack Jennings (Tom Wopat), Jonathan's oldest friend, arrives at the Kent farm looking for support in his campaign for re-election. When a stripper turns up dead, and is revealed to be Jennings' mistress, Jennings is made the prime suspect. Searching for answers, Chloe convinces Lois to go undercover as a stripper, but things take a dangerous turn when Lois is kidnapped by a foreign diplomat's son, Mr. Lyon (Woody Jeffreys), who intends to sell her into slavery. Clark and Chloe save Lois in time, but the diplomat cannot be arrested in the United States. He is however arrested upon his return to Europe thanks to an anonymous tip. Lois moves into the apartment at the Talon.
95	7	"Splinter"	James Marshall	Steven S. DeKnight	November 10, 2005	2T6408	5.51
Clark opens a package sent to Lana containing a new kind of silver kryptonite, causing him to have paranoid delusions about those around him. Lex reveals the spaceship to Lana. The kryptonite makes Clark believe that Chloe is going to reveal his secret, Jonathan is scheming against him with Lionel, and Lex and Lana are having a secret relationship. Chloe and the Kents frantically search for a cure, but it is Fine who comes to Clark's rescue, claiming to be a Kryptonian and knowing Clark's name is Kal-El. Fine steps in just before Clark seriously hurts Lana, who forgives Clark for his actions. Martha and Jonathan learn Chloe knows Clark's secret. Lionel warns Lex that Lana will never love him. Jonathan plans to run against Lex in a campaign for state senator. Fine tells Clark he will help him stop what is coming, and warns him not to trust everyone. After returning to the spaceship, Fine absorbs the silver sheen from the kryptonite and drops the now normal rock next to the ship, revealing he was the one who had mailed it for Clark to be exposed.
96	8	"Solitude"	Paul Shapiro	Todd Slavkin & Darren Swimmer	November 17, 2005	2T6407	5.97
Lionel enlists Chloe to investigate Fine's powers, leading her and Lois to learn that Fine comes from the spaceship. When Martha contracts a strange disease, Clark turns to Fine, who convinces Clark that Jor-El is the one responsible for her illness, when really he is. Fine convinces Clark that the only way to save her is to destroy the Fortress of Solitude, separating Jor-El's link. Once the two arrive at the Fortress, Fine reveals himself to be an artificial intelligence created by Kryptonians and tries to free Zod from the Phantom Zone. Chloe saves Clark from Fine, who is killed in the fight, causing the spaceship to disappear and Martha to recover.
97	9	"Lexmas"	Rick Rosenthal	Holly Harold	December 8, 2005	2T6409	5.37
Lex considers finding or manufacturing damaging information against Jonathan to upset his senatorial race, information that may harm Clark and Martha. Interrupting Clark and Lana's first Christmas, Chloe persuades Clark to play Santa, and deliver gifts to those less fortunate. Lex is shot, falls into a coma, and is visited by the ghost of his mother Lilian (Alisen Down). She shows him a life apart from his father's money and influence, where Lex is married to Lana, and the two are expecting a second child. After Lana dies in Lex's dream due to Lionel's refusal to help, Lex becomes convinced that power—not love—is the key to happiness, and decides to go through with the plot against Jonathan.
98	10	"Fanatic"	Michael Rohl	Wendy Mericle	January 12, 2006	2T6410	5.45
Jonathan's life is threatened by a mysterious source, who urges him to drop out of the state senate race. Lionel intercepts the damaging information against Jonathan and destroys it before it gets to Lex. Clark discovers that Lex's followers, primarily Samantha Drake (Annie Burgstede), are determined to do anything to see that Lex wins the election. She threatens Lois into an assassination attempt on Jonathan during his campaign speech, but is foiled by Clark and apprehended by Lois. Clark and Lana come to a roadblock in their relationship due to Clark being afraid to be intimate with her ever since his powers were restored. Lionel offers Martha some money to help Jonathan's campaign, while Lana believes that the answers she is looking for lie in the first meteor shower once she begins to realize that a spaceship and alien arrived that day and have been on Earth ever since.
99	11	"Lockdown"	Peter Ellis	Steven S. DeKnight	January 19, 2006	2T6411	4.90
Deputies Greg Flynn (Kevin Daniels) and Harris (Sarah Lind), the former who witnessed the Kryptonians land in the second meteor shower, take Lex and Lana hostage, threatening to kill them unless Lex reveals where he hid the spaceship. Lex takes a bullet meant for Lana, and fearing Lex may bleed to death, Lana asks him to tell the officers the location. Sheriff Nancy Adams (Camille Mitchell) is killed by the officers and Lana takes them to an empty location, where Clark saves her. Clark discovers Lana has been researching the spaceship with Lex and fears she is close to discovering his secret, causing friction between them. Jonathan becomes angry after learning the money for his campaign came from Lionel. Chloe tells Clark he needs to tell Lana the truth if he doesn't want to lose her.
100	12	"Reckoning"	Greg Beeman	Kelly Souders & Brian Peterson	January 26, 2006	2T6412	6.28
Clark is finally willing to reveal his secret to Lana, but there are consequences. Jonathan and Lex learn the results of the senatorial election and the life of someone Clark loves, Lana, is finally taken away from him. A desperate Clark appeals to Jor-El for help, only to find himself frantically trying to save her again. Lionel reveals to Jonathan he has a little more up his sleeve. Minutes later, Jonathan dies of a heart attack in front of Martha and Clark.
101	13	"Vengeance"	Jeannot Szwarc	Al Septien & Turi Meyer	February 2, 2006	2T6413	5.37
Clark has been bottling up his grief and anger and is struggling to mourn Jonathan. He has also dropped out of school. When Martha is mugged in Metropolis and Jonathan's watch is stolen, Clark decides to find out who it was that saved her life. He discovers the new reporter at the Daily Planet, a woman named Andrea Rojas (Denise Quiñones), is actually a masked avenger who fights crime at night. Clark's bottled-up grief over the loss of his father threatens to get the best of him as he joins Andrea in her fight against crime. When they track down the mugger from a gang, Clark almost murders him, but hesitates. After they learn he pawned the watch, Andrea murders him. When she discovers that he was the same man who killed her mother and Lionel hired him, she goes after Lionel. She attempts to murder him as well, but Clark convinces her to spare him, and she flees. Martha is asked to take Jonathan's state senate seat and receives counsel from Lionel. Lana finds Jonathan's watch for Clark who apologizes for how he has been acting. He later finds Martha watching home videos of Jonathan and finally begins to cry and let himself mourn his father.
102	14	"Tomb"	Whitney Ransick	Steven S. DeKnight	February 9, 2006	2T6414	5.41
The spirit of a young girl named Gretchen Winters (Leela Savasta) is unleashed after lightning strikes a kryptonite bracelet she was wearing. Clark finds her corpse in the walls of the Talon after the spirit attaches to Chloe. Chloe is believed to be crazy, becoming like her mother. Clark follows the trail of the spirit to find her killer Michael Westmore (Damon Johnson), who has been preying on girls in Smallville for the past decade, and has kidnapped both possessed-Chloe and Lois. Lois subdues Westmore and Gretchen's spirit kills him before departing to the afterlife. Martha accepts Jonathan's senate seat. Chloe visits her mother.
103	15	"Cyborg"	Glen Winter	Caroline Dries	February 16, 2006	2T6415	6.24
A sympathetic doctor named Dr. Hon (Rick Tae) releases a half-human/half-machine subject named Victor Stone (Lee Thompson Young) being held captive and experimented on by the LuthorCorp-owned company SynTechnics. Clark befriends Victor and promises to help him find his girlfriend Katherine (Christie Liang). Chloe and Clark learn the company is owned by LutherCorp but Lex promises he had nothing to do with it. After Victor is shot, he is desperate to see Katherine, allowing Lex and Dr. Alistair Krieg (Mackenzie Gray) to trap him and take him back to LuthorCorp. Clark helps Victor free himself for good. Lana and Clark realize that they are drifting apart in their relationship. Meanwhile, Martha is being blackmailed with Clark's secret caught on video and Lionel offers to step in and deal with the blackmailer (Adrian Hughes). It is revealed that Lionel was behind the blackmailer and that he knows Clark's secret.
104	16	"Hypnotic"	Michael Rohl	Todd Slavkin & Darren Swimmer	March 30, 2006	2T6416	4.78
Fine emerges in a jungle of Honduras and murders two biohazard specialists before stealing a blood sample and burning the evidence. Lex tracks him down and confronts him under the belief he is a covert government operative. Fine claims he is looking for the spaceship and an alien, and warns Lex that if he does not help, it could mean the end of the world. Clark meets a beautiful seductress named Simone Chesterman (Nichole Hiltz) who uses a magical charm to make people succumb to her every wish. It is revealed that Lex is blackmailing her to break up Lana and Clark and uncover his secret. An enchanted Clark reveals his powers to Simone, who seizes the opportunity and, after forcing him to break up with Lana, demands Clark kill Lex. Chloe suspects something is wrong and learns that Clark is being hypnotized. She is able to stop him before he finishes the job, and during a struggle, Simone is shot directly through her charm necklace, shattering it and breaking the hypnosis. Clark determines that keeping his secret from Lana will always lead to him breaking her heart, and therefore they should not be together. Clark tells Lana he does not love her and she says that it is over forever. Multiple clones of Fine come out of the spaceship and fan out in search of more samples. Martha asks Clark to consider if he really thinks Lana is not the one, and Lana confides in Lex.
105	17	"Void"	Jeannot Szwarc	Holly Harold	April 6, 2006	2T6417	4.24
Chloe discovers that Fine is alive and warns Clark, who sets out looking for him. Lana, still upset over her break-up, experiments with a kryptonite drug that allows her to see her deceased parents. A worried Clark rushes to save Lana from hurting herself, but ends up being injected with the kryptonite-laced serum. When Clark flat-lines, he is able to talk to Jonathan, who warns him that Lionel knows his secret.
106	18	"Fragile"	Tom Welling	Todd Slavkin & Darren Swimmer	April 13, 2006	2T6418	3.94
Clark and Martha take in a little girl named Maddie Van Horn (Emily Hirst) after her foster mother is brutally stabbed to death. Maddie becomes the prime suspect, at least in Lois' eyes, when it is discovered that she has the power to manipulate glass. Maddie's father Tyler (Callum Keith Rennie) arrives to claim her and is revealed to be the real murderer when he can also manipulate glass. Lois takes a job as Martha's Chief of Staff, and Chloe walks in on Lex and Lana during an intimate moment.
107	19	"Mercy"	James Marshall	Steven S. DeKnight	April 20, 2006	2T6419	4.41
After a failed take-over of LuthorCorp, a disgruntled employee named Lincoln Cole (Ian Tracey) takes Lionel hostage and orchestrates a series of elaborate games that Lionel must win in order to stay alive. After Clark tells Martha that Lionel knows his secret, she inadvertently becomes a pawn in Lincoln's game and ends up fighting for her own life. In trying to save his mother, Clark openly shows his power to Lionel when he catches an elevator with Martha and Lionel inside. Lex confronts Lionel about Clark's secret but Lionel covers for him. Clark confronts Lionel about why he kept his secret and Lionel affirms he won't alter his destiny while Clark doesn't trust Lionel and threatens him to stay away. An intense headache leads Lionel to begin writing a message.
108	20	"Fade"	Terrence O'Hara	Turi Meyer & Al Septien	April 27, 2006	2T6421	4.34
While in Metropolis, Clark saves the life of a stranger named Graham Garrett (Alex Scarlis) who vows to repay Clark for his kindness, but Graham happens to be a hit man with the ability to render himself invisible and he decides killing Lex would be the best gift he could give Clark. Meanwhile, Lana tells Clark about her growing relationship with Lex. Also, Lex is revealed to be working with Fine on releasing a bioweapon.
109	21	"Oracle"	Whitney Ransick	Story by : Neil Sadhu & Daniel Sulzberg; Teleplay by : Caroline Dries	May 4, 2006	2T6420	4.81
Clark is stunned when he sees his father's ghost at the graveyard, but becomes even more confused when Jonathan tells him he must kill Lionel. Jonathan appears again and gives Martha the same message. Lex develops a vaccine for Fine's deadly virus, but Fine intervenes and injects him with the vaccine. Clark realizes Jonathan is really Fine in disguise. Lionel tells Martha the truth about his talk with Jonathan. Clark and Chloe deduce with Lionel's help that Lionel's writings are a warning about Zod coming.
110	22	"Vessel"	James Marshall	Kelly Souders & Brian Peterson	May 11, 2006	2T6422	4.85
Fine unleashes a crippling computer virus, which will lead to the destruction of Earth via pandemonium and refuses to stop it unless Clark agrees to release Zod. Clark turns to Jor-El, who informs him that Zod needs a vessel to inhabit. Clark must destroy that vessel and that vessel is Lex. Lex is stunned by his newfound powers and shares the discovery with Lana, who decides to stand by him. Chloe gives Clark a final kiss goodbye as Metropolis goes dark and mayhem begins. Clark confronts Lex and reveals his powers in doing so, but he cannot bring himself to kill him and instead stabs Fine but in doing so he opens the portal for Zod to inhabit Lex. Zod plans to destroy Earth and propositions Clark to join him, but when he refuses he sends him to the Phantom Zone. Martha and Lois' plane is hijacked and taken to a dangerous location by Fine and they collapse due to no oxygen. Chloe and Lionel are attacked and left for dead by rioters. Lana meets Lex, unaware he is Zod, who passionately kisses her as Metropolis burns and ultimately the entire Earth finally loses power.

== Cast and characters ==
=== Main ===
- Tom Welling as Clark Kent
- Kristin Kreuk as Lana Lang (Note: Absent in two episodes)
- Michael Rosenbaum as Lex Luthor
  - Rosenbaum also portrays Zod in Lex's body in "Vessel"
- Erica Durance as Lois Lane (Note: Absent in nine episodes)
- Allison Mack as Chloe Sullivan
- John Glover as Lionel Luthor (Note: Absent in seven episodes)
- Annette O'Toole as Martha Kent (Note: Absent in three episodes)
- John Schneider as Jonathan Kent (Note: Absent in ten episodes)

=== Recurring ===
- James Marsters as Milton Fine / Brainiac
- Terence Stamp as the voice of Jor-El

== Tie-in ==
Since the second season, a promotional tie-in titled Chloe's Chronicles was established to wrap up "unfinished business" from the television series through the use of internet episodes. During season five, the series was evolved into Vengeance Chronicles. In this series, Chloe joins forces with a costumed vigilante she dubs the Angel of Vengeance, who was introduced in the episode "Vengeance", to expose Lex Luthor's Level 33.1 experiments on meteor-infected people.

== Awards ==
In 2006, the show was awarded an Emmy for Outstanding Editing for a Series for the episode "Arrival". Mack was awarded Best Sidekick in 2006. Guest star Emily Hirst was nominated for a Young Artist Award for her portrayal of Maddie Van Horn in "Fragile". For the 32nd Annual Saturn Awards, the show received seven nominations: Best Network Television Series; Best Actor and Actress for Welling and Kreuk; Best Supporting Actor and Actress for Rosenbaum, Durance, and Mack; and Best Television Release on DVD.

== Home media release ==
The complete fifth season of Smallville was released on September 12, 2006, in North America. Additional releases in region 2 and region 4 took place on August 28, 2006, and April 4, 2007, respectively. The DVD box set included various special features, including episode commentary, The Chloe Chronicles: Volume II, a behind-the-scenes featurette on the making of the 100th episode, Vengeance Chronicles webisodes, and a preview of the documentary Look, Up in the Sky! The Amazing Story of Superman (2006). For the 20th anniversary, the complete series was released for the first time on Blu-ray on October 16, 2021. The Blu-ray release marks the first time season 5 being released on Blu-ray. Season 5 had previously been released in high definition on HD-DVD only.
