= Smallville season 1 =

Season of television series

Smallville
- Season 1
- DVD cover featuring star Tom Welling
- Showrunners: Alfred Gough; Miles Millar
- Starring: Tom Welling; Kristin Kreuk; Michael Rosenbaum; Eric Johnson; Sam Jones III; Allison Mack; Annette O'Toole; John Schneider
- No. of episodes: 21

Release
- Original network: The WB
- Original release: October 16, 2001 – May 21, 2002

Season chronology
- Next → Season 2

The first season of Smallville, an American television series developed by Alfred Gough and Miles Millar, began airing on October 16, 2001, on The WB television network. The series recounts the early adventures of Kryptonian Clark Kent as he adjusts to his developing superpowers in the fictional town of Smallville, Kansas, during the years before he becomes Superman. The first season comprises 21 episodes and concluded its initial airing on May 21, 2002. Regular cast members during season one include Tom Welling, Kristin Kreuk, Michael Rosenbaum, Eric Johnson, Sam Jones III, Allison Mack, Annette O'Toole, and John Schneider.

The season's stories focus on Martha and Jonathan Kent's (O'Toole and Schneider) attempts to help their adopted son Clark (Welling) cope with his alien origin and control his developing superhuman abilities. Clark must deal with the meteor-infected individuals that begin appearing in Smallville, his love for Lana Lang (Kreuk), and not being able to tell his two best friends, Pete Ross (Jones III) and Chloe Sullivan (Mack), about his abilities or his origins. Clark also befriends Lex Luthor (Rosenbaum) after saving Lex's life. The season also follows Lex, as he tries to assert his independence from his father, Lionel Luthor (recurring guest star John Glover).

The episodes were filmed primarily in Vancouver and post-production work took place in Los Angeles. Gough and Millar assisted the writing staff with week-to-week story development. "Villain of the week" storylines were predominant during the first season; physical effects, make-up effects, and computer generated imagery became important components as well. Limited filming schedules sometimes forced guest actors to perform physical stunts, and the series regulars were more than willing to do stunt work. Episode budgets ultimately became strictly regulated, as the show frequently ran over budget during the first half of the season. The pilot broke The WB's viewership record for a series debut, and was nominated for various awards. Although the villain of the week storylines became a concern for producers, critical reception was generally favorable, and the series was noted as having a promising start. The first season was released on DVD on September 23, 2003, and included various special features that focused on individual episodes and the series as a whole. It has also been released on home media in regions 2 and 4 in the international markets.

== Episodes ==
No. overall	No. in season	Title	Directed by	Written by	Original release date	Prod. code	U.S. viewers (millions)
1	1	"Pilot"	David Nutter	Alfred Gough & Miles Millar	October 16, 2001	475165	8.35
In October 1989, a meteor shower hits Smallville and with it arrives a little boy. The child is adopted by Jonathan and Martha Kent, and named Clark Kent. Twelve years later, Clark struggles to understand his identity. After Clark saves Lex Luthor's life after Lex drives his Porsche off a bridge, the two become fast friends. After sharing an intimate moment in the graveyard with Lana Lang, Clark is forced into a school hazing ritual led by Lana's jealous boyfriend Whitney Fordman. Meanwhile, Jeremy Creek (Adrian Glynn), a teenage boy who was left in a coma after the first meteor shower, wakes up and sets out to get revenge on those that hurt him. Afterward, he prepares to do the same to the rest of the Smallville High students, but Clark arrives in time to stop him.
2	2	"Metamorphosis"	Michael Watkins & Philip Sgriccia	Alfred Gough & Miles Millar	October 23, 2001	227601	7.34
Greg Arkin (Chad Donella) gets into a car accident with his meteor rock-enhanced insects, which escape from their containers and begin stinging him. The resulting attack transforms him into a half man/half insect creature. Rapidly going through a metamorphosis, Greg kidnaps Lana so he can mate with her. After talking with Whitney, Clark realizes where Greg has taken Lana and leaves to rescue her. During the fight, Greg accidentally crushes himself under some mechanical equipment, resulting in a mass of insects flooding out from underneath. Before Clark can return to Lana, Whitney arrives and receives credit for her rescue.
3	3	"Hothead"	Greg Beeman	Greg Walker	October 30, 2001	227603	6.02
A meteor rock-infused sauna endows coach Arnold (Dan Lauria) with pyrokinesis. After several football players are caught cheating, Clark's best friend Chloe Sullivan discovers that Arnold assisted the players when they cheated. Arnold asks Clark to join the football team, and Clark agrees against his father's wishes. Clark confronts Arnold before his first game, after Arnold attempts to kill Chloe and another football player for exposing the truth about the cheating. The coach's fury gets the better of him as he engulfs himself in flames while battling Clark.
4	4	"X-Ray"	James Frawley	Mark Verheiden	November 6, 2001	227604	6.63
Clark begins to develop X-ray vision when he is thrown through a window by Lex, who has just robbed the local bank. Clark accidentally x-rays "Lex's" body and discovers a green glow around his skeleton as Lex is running away. When it turns out someone was impersonating him, Lex is cleared of all charges. After gaining control over his X-ray vision, Clark discovers that Tina Greer (Lizzy Caplan), a young woman infected with meteor rock radiation, can morph into anyone she wants. He also learns that she robbed the bank when he X-rays her locker and sees the money from the bank. After a brief battle, Clark knocks Tina unconscious so the authorities can arrest her. Meanwhile, Lex hires Roger Nixon (Tom O'Brien), an Inquisitor reporter, to find out how he survived driving his Porsche off a bridge.
5	5	"Cool"	James A. Contner	Michael Green	November 13, 2001	227605	5.94
During a party at Crater Lake, Sean Kelvin (Michael Coristine) falls into the frozen lake and emerges with an insatiable hunger for heat, thanks to the meteor rocks on the lake bottom. In an effort to stay warm, Sean sucks the heat from anyone he can while freezing them in the process. Sean goes after Chloe, but Clark is there to stop him. Clark finds Sean, who is headed to Luthor Mansion, but is left frozen when Sean sucks the heat from his body. Clark's body reheats itself, and he arrives at the mansion just as Sean is about to attack Martha, who came with Jonathan to discuss their financial troubles with Lex. During the fight, Clark throws Sean into a lake, which immediately freezes with Sean inside.
6	6	"Hourglass"	Chris Long	Doris Egan	November 20, 2001	227606	6.36
Clark meets an elderly, blind woman, named Cassandra Carver (Jackie Burroughs), who receives precognitive visions by touching someone. When she touches Clark both of them see Clark surrounded by the tombstones of everyone he loves. Harry Bollston (George Murdock), an elderly man at a nursing home, falls into a meteor rock filled pond, which reverses the aging process. Now a young man (Eric Christian Olsen) with age-shifting abilities, Harry uses his new youth to get revenge on the children of the jury members that put him away for murder decades earlier, one of whom was Jonathan's father. Clark stops Harry before he can kill Martha, who happened to be home when Harry came looking for Jonathan with Harry dying when the silo floods with grain. Lex visits Cassandra, after listening to Clark, before she dies after seeing his future, which entails blood raining from the sky.
7	7	"Craving"	Philip Sgriccia	Michael Green	November 27, 2001	227607	7.39
Jodi Melville (Amy Adams) is tired of being overweight, so she creates her own diet, which consists of vegetables polluted by meteor rock. The new diet causes her to shed weight faster than she can handle, which forces her to suck human fat to satisfy her hunger and even causes her to feed off a deer that she accidentally hit with her car. When Clark's best friend Pete Ross arrives to pick her up for Lana's birthday party, her hunger gets the better of her, and she tries to feast on Pete. Chloe and Clark discover the truth about Jodi's weight loss, and Clark rushes to her house to save Pete. Clark stops Jodi from killing Pete, and gets her the help she needs to maintain a healthy weight; in the process, however, Clark misses Lana's birthday party, but makes it up to her by giving her his present: a makeshift drive-in theater complete with the classic Bugs Bunny cartoon High Diving Hare. Meanwhile, Lex becomes interested in the effects of meteor rocks, and funds a study on the green meteor fragments.
8	8	"Jitters"	Michael Watkins	Cherie Bennett & Jeff Gottesfeld	December 11, 2001	227602	5.82
LuthorCorp is experimenting with meteor rocks, and overexposure to the rocks has caused employee Earl Jenkins (Tony Todd) to develop violent seizures. During a field trip to the local LuthorCorp plant, Clark and his classmates are taken hostage by Earl, who wants into "Level 3" (a secret testing facility at the plant) so he can find a cure for himself. Clark discovers "Level 3" just as Lex trades himself for the hostages. Clark reveals "Level 3" to Earl and Lex, but Earl's seizures put all three in danger. Clark manages to keep them all alive, and Lex makes a public statement that LuthorCorp will find a cure for Earl's condition.
9	9	"Rogue"	David Carson	Mark Verheiden	January 15, 2002	227608	5.78
Sam Phelan (Cameron Dye), a corrupt Metropolis cop, witnesses Clark using his abilities and decides to blackmail Clark. When Clark double crosses him, Phelan frames Jonathan for murder, and forces Clark to help him steal a priceless Alexander the Great chest plate. Double crossing him again, Clark alerts the security to the heist. Phelan is gunned down after trying to shoot his way out of trouble, and the charges are dropped against Jonathan when Lex's lawyers arrive. Lex and an old flame, Victoria Hardwick (Kelly Brook), plot to take over their parents' corporations.
10	10	"Shimmer"	D. J. Caruso	Mark Verheiden & Michael Green	January 29, 2002	227609	7.02
Amy Palmer (Azura Skye) is obsessed with Lex. After discovering that Lex's roses release an invisibility fluid, someone attempts to make sure that Lex knows Victoria is wrong for him. Victoria is forced out of the house after almost being killed by an invisible assailant. Amy is blamed for the attack when a watch Lex's mother gave him turns up in her drawer, but it is her brother Jeff (Kett Turton) who is the attacker. Clark confronts Jeff in Lex's manor, and using some paint, keeps Jeff visible long enough to be arrested.
11	11	"Hug"	Chris Long	Doris Egan	February 5, 2002	227610	6.38
Bob Rickman (Rick Peters) has the ability to bend others to his will, because of an incident with the meteor rocks years earlier, with a single handshake. Rickman plans to put a new pesticide plant in Smallville, and he needs the Kent farm to do it. Using his ability, Rickman convinces Jonathan to sell the farm. Clark seeks out Kyle Tippet (Gregory Sporleder) for assistance, after learning that Kyle was with Rickman during the meteor shower; Kyle refuses to help. Clark later returns with Chloe, who wants to know how Kyle and Bob can control others. Kyle uses his abilities on Chloe, who reveals her love for Clark. Rickman uses his ability to convince Lex to kill both Clark and Kyle. While Clark is battling Lex, Kyle, who has more control over the ability, forces Rickman to take his own life.
12	12	"Leech"	Greg Beeman	Timothy Schlattmann	February 12, 2002	227611	6.07
During a class field trip, lightning strikes Clark and classmate Eric Summers (Shawn Ashmore) while Eric is holding a piece of meteor rock. Clark's powers are transferred to Eric, allowing Clark to finally live a normal life. Eric initially uses the powers for good, but soon begins abusing them. Clark decides to sacrifice the chance at a normal life so that Eric does not hurt anyone. Hoping Eric took his weakness along with his strength, Clark confronts Eric at an electrical generator and uses the electricity, along with a meteor rock, to get his powers back. Meanwhile, Lex double-crosses Victoria, who was planning to do the same to him, and has her father's company buy up a worthless research lab. The result allows LuthorCorp to buy the Hardwick company.
13	13	"Kinetic"	Robert Singer	Philip Levens	February 26, 2002	227612	6.20
Three ex-jocks named Derek Fox (David Lovgren), Scott Bowman (David Coles), and Wade Mahaney (Kavan Smith) are using meteor rock-saturated tattoos to give themselves the ability to pass through solid objects. Using their ability, they begin robbing banks. Clark has a confrontation with the thieves and is unable to stop them because of his weakness to the meteor rocks. The thieves decide to recruit Whitney, who has recently begun hanging out with them after losing his football scholarship, but he has second thoughts. Clark helps Whitney and Lex, who is now being blackmailed, fight the thieves. With their powers growing weak from overuse of the serum, Clark is able to subdue them where Wade is killed and the other two are arrested.
14	14	"Zero"	Michael Katleman	Story by : Alfred Gough & Miles Millar; Teleplay by : Mark Verheiden	March 12, 2002	227613	6.90
Lex's past comes back to haunt him, when Jude Royce (Corin Nemec), a man presumed to be dead, resurfaces after three years and kidnaps Lex. Jude tortures Lex in an attempt to get him to reveal the truth about the cover up of his death. Roy Rothman (Eric Breker) is revealed to be the true orchestrator, having found short order cook who resembles Jude (also portrayed by Corin Nemec) to assist him in his scheme. Angered over the suicide of his sister Amanda (Jud Tylor) who was Jude's ex-fiancée, which he believes is Lex's fault, he wants Lex to pay for her death. Clark saves Lex, but he begins to worry about Lex's past. During a class project, Chloe discovers inconsistencies in Clark's adoption, and it puts strain on their friendship.
15	15	"Nicodemus"	James Marshall	Story by : Greg Walker; Teleplay by : Michael Green	March 19, 2002	227614	6.74
Dr. Steven Hamilton (Joe Morton) uses meteor rocks to resurrect a toxic flower named Nicodemus which has been extinct for 100 years. If someone is sprayed by the flower's toxic mist, they lose all of their inhibitions, are more honest, and use violence to help them get what they desire. Jonathan, Lana, and Pete are all infected with the flower's toxins, and begin to act out of character. Clark prevents them all from harming themselves or someone else. After a while, the flower's toxins cause the three to fall into a coma. Unhappy that Dr. Hamilton has spent his time resurrecting dangerous flowers, Lex has a team of specialists create a cure for Jonathan, Lana, and Pete.
16	16	"Stray"	Paul Shapiro	Philip Levens	April 16, 2002	227615	6.03
Ryan James (Ryan Kelley), a young boy who can read minds, is forced to use his ability to help his stepparents rob stores. Ryan escapes his step-parents James Gibson (Jim Shield) and Debra Burch (Brandy Ledford) and is taken in by the Kents, who are unaware of his ability. Ryan immediately bonds with Clark, whom he sees as his personal superhero. James finds him in Smallville and kidnaps him. He attempts to use Ryan's abilities to steal Lex's trust fund. Clark comes to Ryan's aid before his stepfather can kill him. Ryan's aunt is located and she agrees to take custody of him.
17	17	"Reaper"	Terrence O'Hara	Cameron Litvack	April 23, 2002	227616	5.48
Tyler Randall (Reynaldo Rosales), while trying to assist the suicide of his ailing mother, accidentally falls out of a window and a piece of meteor rock becomes embedded in his wrist as he dies. When the coroner removes the rock from his wrist, Tyler becomes reanimated. Now whenever Tyler touches someone, or something, they instantly incinerate and die. Believing he is helping, Tyler tries easing the pain of Whitney's dying father. Clark arrives in time to stop him and informs him that his mother is still alive. Thinking his mother could not accept who he had become, Tyler takes his own life.
18	18	"Drone"	Michael Katleman	Michael Green & Philip Levens	April 30, 2002	227617	5.68
Class elections are being held, and Pete nominates Clark. Apprehensive at first, Clark soon takes to the idea. A rival candidate, Sasha Woodman (Shonda Farr), does not appreciate the competition and sends out swarms of bees to take care of the other competitors. Eventually, the bees become dissatisfied with Sasha's demands and turn on her where they sting her into a coma. Lex's father Lionel Luthor (John Glover) has a journalist write a scathing exposé on Lex, but Lex has the story dropped when he gets the journalist promoted to editor. Lana gets cutthroat with the Talon and reports the rival coffee shop to the health board.
19	19	"Crush"	James Marshall	Philip Levens & Alfred Gough & Miles Millar	May 7, 2002	227618	6.42
After a hit-and-run accident destroys his drawing hand, Justin Gaines (Adam Brody) is left with an unexpected gift of telekinesis. Justin uses his new gift to exact revenge on those who wronged him. Using Chloe to discover the identity of his hit and run driver, Justin sets out to kill the person who took his drawing hands. Justin kills Principal Kwan (Hiro Kanagawa), believing he was the driver who hit him, and turns on Chloe when she discovers what he has been doing. Clark knocks Justin unconscious before he can kill Chloe while Principal Kwan's son turns himself in being the real culprit of the hit-and-run. Whitney's father, who has been battling heart problems, dies.
20	20	"Obscura"	Terrence O'Hara	Story by : Greg Walker; Teleplay by : Mark Verheiden & Michael Green	May 14, 2002	227619	6.10
An explosion near meteor rocks gives Lana the ability to see through another person's eyes. Lana watches through the stranger's eyes as they kidnap Chloe. Teaming with Clark, Lana uses her gift to help locate Chloe. The kidnapper turns out to be a struggling police officer/part-time amusement park security guard named Gary Watts (Darren Klimek) looking for an easy promotion. Clark rescues Chloe and Watts is shot by the arriving police officers. Whitney finds some military medals his father earned, and takes it as a sign he should do something else with his life. Lex learns of a ship that crashed during the meteor shower, and discovers an octagonal disc made of an alloy not found on Earth.
21	21	"Tempest"	Greg Beeman	Story by : Philip Levens; Teleplay by : Alfred Gough & Miles Millar	May 21, 2002	227620	5.96
Lionel closes the Smallville plant and blames it on his son for not turning out a large profit as instructed; Lex decides to initiate an employee buyout of the local plant to save everyone's jobs and forge his own future with LexCorp. Meanwhile, Whitney decides to join the Marines and leaves Smallville. Learning the truth about Clark, Nixon attempts to expose Clark's secret to the world. As Lana drives home after dropping Whitney off at the bus station, three tornadoes touch down, forcing her off the road. When the news is announced at the school dance, Clark and Chloe are about to kiss, but Clark leaves the dance to make sure Lana is okay, leaving Chloe upset. Just as Lana is pulled into a tornado, Clark arrives and speeds in after her.

== Cast and characters ==
=== Main ===
- Tom Welling as Clark Kent
- Kristin Kreuk as Lana Lang
- Michael Rosenbaum as Lex Luthor
- Eric Johnson as Whitney Fordman (Note: Absent in two episodes)
- Sam Jones III as Pete Ross (Note: Absent in one episode)
- Allison Mack as Chloe Sullivan
- Annette O'Toole as Martha Kent
- John Schneider as Jonathan Kent

=== Recurring ===
- John Glover as Lionel Luthor
- Sarah-Jane Redmond as Nell Potter
- Hiro Kanagawa as Principal Kwan
- Tom O'Brien as Roger Nixon
- Mitchell Kosterman as Sheriff Ethan Miller
- Kelly Brook as Victoria Hardwick

== Production ==
=== Writing ===
Ground rules for story development were established at the outset. Part of the marketing pitch, "no flights, no tights" dictated that Clark Kent would not wear the Superman costume, nor would he fly. After initial discussion of possible storylines, a second rule decreed that Clark could never directly kill anyone. This created a dilemma since Clark would be able to defeat the "bad guys" from week to week. A solution was developed in later episodes with the introduction of the Belle Reve sanitarium; Belle Reve is a federal prison for metahumans and other supervillains in the comics.

After setting the ground rules, developers and showrunners Alfred Gough and Miles Millar conceived ideas that facilitated week-to-week story development. For example, kryptonite's role was expanded to include enhancement of the sins of the antagonist: instead of creating physical monsters, exposure to kryptonite would amplify their personal demons. This was not treated as literally in the pilot and "Metamorphosis" as it was in later episodes. In "Cool", it was "the 'cool' kid literally [becoming] cool, needing human body heat to stay alive". After several episodes, the writers developed a story that would help establish the show as more than a "villain of the week" series. The ninth episode, "Rogue", which took longer than usual to develop due to its divergence from the standard formula, became their first "true crime story" and demonstrated that Smallville could include more than kryptonite-powered villains.

"What if" episodes were another Millar-Gough concept used to generate first season storylines. These episodes posed underlying questions about Clark. Episodes would evolve from basic questions, including: "what if someone had a crush on Lana, and acted on that obsession"; "what if someone found out Clark's secret"; "what if someone else had Clark's powers?" These three questions developed into the episodes "Metamorphosis", "Rogue", and "Leech", respectively. "Stray", episode 16, answered the question, "what if Clark had been adopted by the wrong parents and his powers were exploited?" "X-Ray" writer Mark Verheiden and the rest of the crew realized divergent, unrelated storylines were not the best way to create episodes for Smallville. Verheiden believes "X-Ray" was the first episode that managed to bring all the side-stories together so that they affected characters other than Clark and Lana.

"As [Lex] touches one of the flowers it withers and dies, sending a cancerous wave of death rippling out across the field, laying waste to everything in its path. Suddenly, A BLOOD RED DROP falls from the deep blue sky, stains his suit. Then another falls, and another and another, until the sky is raining red. As he opens his mouth to scream, there's a flash of white".
— Vision of Lex Luthor's future, as described in the script.

"Hourglass" was one of the stories included in Millar and Gough's initial pitch to the network; at the time it was referred to as "Cassandra". "Hourglass" was the first episode to present two, distinct stories: the vengeful serial killer and the second sighted Cassandra. Two significant storylines in the same episode forced the writers to spend more time developing the episode. Cassandra's "visceral vision" (as it was referred to in the script) of Lex's future was developed into color storyboards to better illustrate to the filmmakers the "blood rain" described in the text.

When the filmmakers were dissatisfied with the initial drafts of episodes, specifically with the evolution of characters, they would rewrite events, or add scenes to re-establish the original vision. The character of Earl Jenkins (Tony Todd), intended to be a sympathetic villain, came across as "completely unlikable" in the original draft of "Jitters". The character suffers from over-exposure to kryptonite, causing massive seizures; if Jenkins happened to grab someone, they could be shaken to death. Originally, the character is first seen banging on the door of LuthorCorp and killing a security guard during one of his seizures. To present a more favorable aspect to the audience, a scene in which Earl visits his infant child was added to show that he was not a "raving maniac". Similar rewrites occurred with the characters Ryan James (Ryan Kelley) in "Stray" and Tyler Randall (Reynaldo Rosales) in "Reaper". In the original draft of "Stray", Ryan developed his telepathic abilities from exposure to kryptonite; to emphasize the show was not always about kryptonite-infected villains, the story was revised so that Ryan had his ability from birth. The network also expressed dissatisfaction with Ryan as a murderer, so the character was rewritten to be the "nice kid". The character of Tyler shared Earl Jenkins's issue: he was not sympathetic enough in the filmmakers' eyes; intended to be an escaped prisoner, he was rewritten to be "the world's deadliest nice guy".

=== Filming ===
Production was set up in Vancouver, British Columbia, Canada, because the creators were looking for a "Middle America landscape", and Vancouver was a good substitute for Kansas. David Nutter, the director of the pilot, was given 16 days for main unit filming, twice that of the normal timeframe. Despite the extended schedule, it was still a short amount of time, and he shot the pilot primarily from storyboards created by Adrien Van Viersen.

Millar developed most of the look for Smallville with the idea that Smallville should be the epitome of "Smalltown, USA". Millar's design required existing buildings to be painted, built, and remodeled. The Kent farm is the home of the Andalini family, and their barn was used for the pilot before a new barn was built. The new barn was one of the major additions to the sets of the episode "Metamorphosis". Production designer Doug Higgins and his crew built a fully functioning, three-story barn for the Kent farm on a converted soundstage in Burnaby. For the pilot, the crew built only a loft, with a set of stairs leading up to it, inside the existing barn on the Andalinis' property. To resemble the Andalinis' barn as closely as possible, Higgins had his crew locate 100-year-old wood to match the look of the Andalinis' barn. The episode "Hourglass" called for several scenes to take place at the White House. Instead of building their own set, the Smallville producers called John Wells, producer of the political drama television series The West Wing (1999–2006), and obtained permission to use the West Wing set to film the vision of Lex's future.

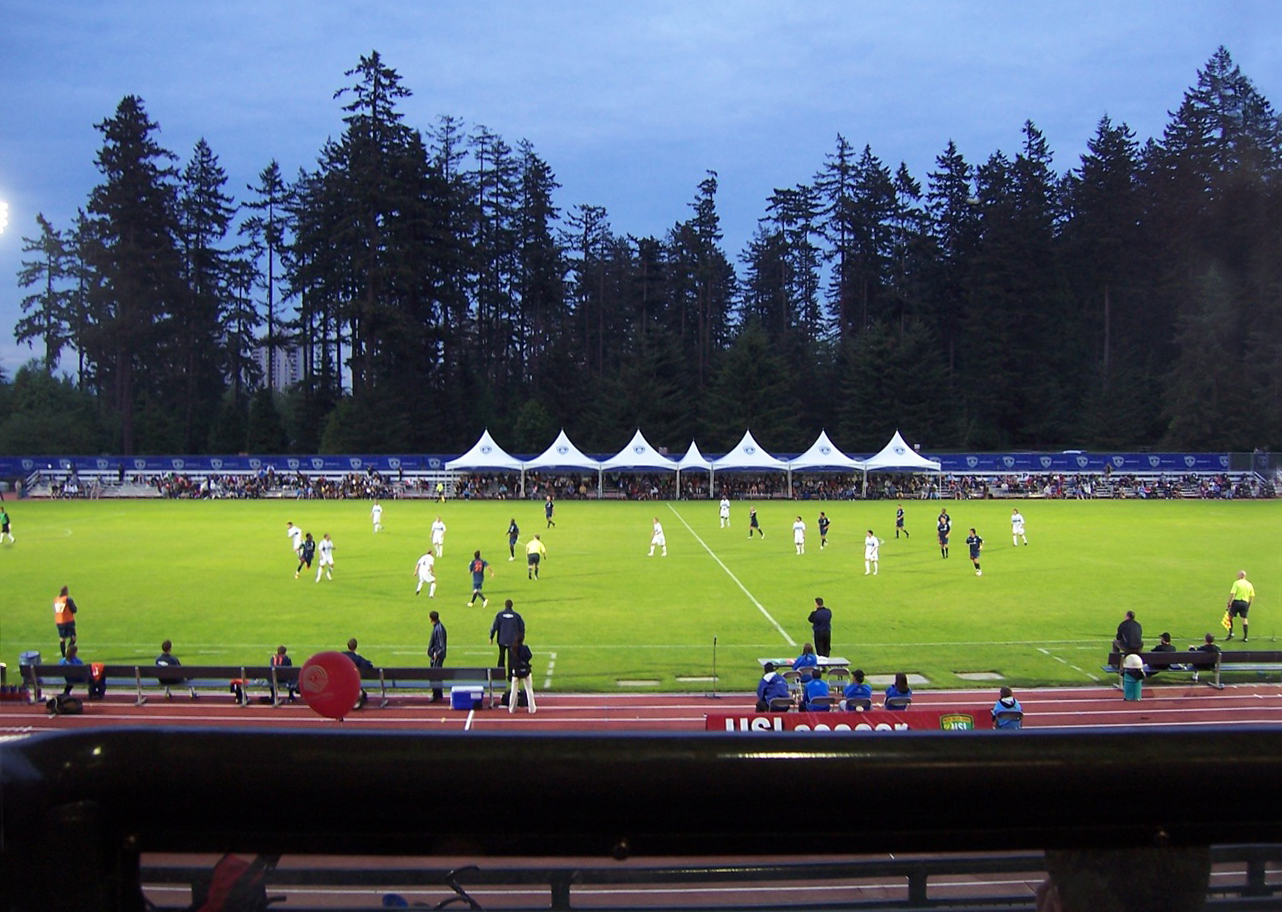
Swangard stadium was the location of the opening football sequence for "Hothead". The production crew brought in water towers for the sequence, which called for the game to be played at night in the rain.

When the Smallville crew was not filming on one of the constructed sets, or on a sound stage, they were shooting on location at the surrounding Vancouver sites. During the filming of "Metamorphosis", Vancouver was holding a farmers' market, which proved beneficial to the Smallville crew, as "Metamorphosis" called for a similar event to take place in the episode. The market was on the verge of ending, so the filmmakers shot what wide-angle scenes they could at the time, and filmed a close up conversation between Whitney Fordman and Clark at the Andalini's farm, weeks after the initial market shooting. Other filming locations include Vancouver's Pacific National Exhibition and Burnaby's Swangard Stadium. The Pacific National Exhibit provided a storage silo for a scene in "Hourglass", which involved Harry Bollston (Eric Christian Olsen) attacking Martha Kent in the Kents' corn silo. "Hothead" director Greg Beeman, who had previously worked with Gough and Millar on Martial Law (1998–2000) and The Strip (1999–2000), used Swangard Stadium, as a substitution for Smallville High Stadium, for the opening football scene that took place at night.

When filming fell behind schedule, another director came in to assist the main unit director in finishing the episode. Beeman assisted director Chris Long for the two "visceral visions of the future" that appeared in the episode "Hourglass". "Jitters" was an episode with so many changes that its initial scheduling as the second episode of the season was pushed back to the eighth spot. By the time filming for "Jitters" was completed, three directors had worked on the project: Beeman, Philip Sgriccia, and Michael W. Watkins, the latter who was given sole directing credit for the episode.

=== Effects ===
A big part of the Smallville series relies on the effects it delivers, whether digital, physical, or special make-up effects. The effects shots, part of the post-production work, are developed and added in Los Angeles. Nutter hired Thomas Special Effects to create digital cornfields for the pilot episode. After attempting to grow ten thousand stalks of corn in a greenhouse, which only grew two feet tall, Nutter was forced to rely primarily on digital corn. Faux corn was also flown in from Arizona. CGI supervisor Bill Millar created digital butterflies for a scene in Lana's bedroom, and all the insects Greg Arkin (Chad Donella) collected in the episode "Metamorphosis". Greg's insects had to be created digitally, because a green hue was needed to illustrate the kryptonite radiation in the insects. After the opening credits, the first person view of someone, later revealed to be Clark, flying through Lana's open window and into her bedroom was created digitally. The effect was accomplished with stock footage, a sound stage and computer generated imagery. Stock footage shot from a helicopter, as it flew over several farms during the day, was used for the first person point of view. It was altered from day to night, and a CGI house was created in an empty field. Lana's bedroom as built on a soundstage, and CGI was used to create the illusion of someone traveling through her open window and stopping above her bed.

A green hue and raised veins in Clark's hand, created digitally, were used to help illustrate the effects of kryptonite poisoning.

It was decided the effects of kryptonite poisoning on Clark, "Clark time", and the appearance of kryptonite when in the proximity of Clark would need to be illustrated in a way the audience could understand if they were not familiar with the character. Gough and Millar, after doing some research, learned the female audience was not aware of what was happening when Clark was exposed to kryptonite. Beginning with "Metamorphosis", whenever Clark was exposed to kryptonite, his veins would rise up and develop a green hue to illustrate the effect it was having. Close-up shots of Clark's hand were used for these scenes, and it was all created with digital animation. Gough and Millar developed the idea that kryptonite would only glow when it was around Clark, as it was meant to demonstrate the draining of his powers. "Clark time", the same idea behind bullet time, was created because previous incarnations had not explained the idea of what the world appears like to Clark when he is using his powers. The first instance of "Clark time" was used in the "Metamorphosis" scene where Greg attacks Clark and Jonathan Kent in their barn. Jonathan is pushed over a banister and falls in the direction of some dangerous farm equipment. The effect involved slowing time down for everything except Clark, who would be moving at normal pace. When tackling Clark's emerging power of X-ray vision, Gough and Millar wanted to be able to see skeletons and bones, as opposed to previous incarnations that treated the ability like "see-through" vision. The recent advances in computer imagery helped them complete that task.

The digital effects costs for each episode could stretch the budget thin. In "Shimmer", Bill Millar planned to create an artificial sunset for the closing scene involving Clark and Lana. The effects shot was supposed to last only a couple of seconds. James Marshall, the second unit director for the episode, decided to shoot the entire scene over the shoulders of Clark and Lana, looking at the sunset. The scene called for two greenscreen shots, but when Marshall was finished he had created seventeen greenscreen shots. The seventeen shots, which produced the artificial sunset, cost $50,000 to produce. By comparison, the entire CGI budget for that episode had been set at $65,000-$100,000.

Over-spending of that nature became a regular occurrence on the Smallville set. The regularity of over-spending came to an end with "Kinetic", as the studio decided to be stricter. With the budget on a stiffer guideline, the filmmakers were forced to cut scenes from "Kinetic", an episode that was caught in the push for more budget-friendly scripts. One of the scenes that was cut involved one of the thieves phasing through a safe wall, and acting as a portal for the merchandise to be passed through. When digital effects were not an option, Mike Walls, the physical effects supervisor who began his Smallville career with "Leech", still tried to provide big effects. For instance, Walls used 75 cars for the final action scene of "Kinetic", which were cabled off to protect the actors. Stunt coordinator Lauro Chartrand attempted to make sure the actors were used as much as possible when performing fight scenes, unless the scenes were particularly dangerous. The fast shooting schedule forces Chartrand to rely on guest stars who can perform their own stunts, because of the limited time to find a "good double" for the actor.

Physical effects were not an issue for the series regulars. Allison Mack performed her own stunts for the scene in "Hothead" where her character's office is set on fire, and again in "Kinetic", when she was cabled off and dangled 50 ft (15 m) above the ground. For "Nicodemus", the stunt coordinator received twice the help. Kristin Kreuk was expected to go to the tenth rung of a water tower, in a scene which involved her character climbing to the top and falling off. As filming progressed, Kreuk climbed to the top, so the crew cabled her off and dropped her 40 ft (12 m) to the bottom. John Schneider's experience from The Dukes of Hazzard (1979–1985) led to him performing the stunt driving for his character. The scene required Schneider to slide his truck around a corner, while yelling at some pedestrians on the sidewalk. The previous scene had established the driver side window as closed, so Schneider improvised and opened the driver's door as he slid 90° around a corner.

== Reception ==
The series' pilot broke The WB's record for highest-rated debut with 8.35 million viewers, 3.8/9 in the 18-49 demographic, 4.5/12 in the 18–34 demographic and beat its lead-in Gilmore Girls, which was viewed by 5.99 million viewers, 2.4/6 in the 18-49 demographic, 2.8/8 in the 18-34 demographic by 39.4%, 58.3%, 60.7% respectively. In the 18–34 male demographic, its 5.0 rating nearly tripled its lead-in (1.7). After airing the first two episodes, which averaged 7.8 million viewers, the WB placed an order for a full season of 21 episodes. The first season averaged 5.9 million viewers weekly, placing #115 in the Nielsen ratings alongside Futurama, The Ellen Show, and Star Trek: Enterprise. The pilot and "Tempest" were selected in The Futon Critic's 50 best episodes of 2001 and 2002, respectively. The pilot placed 31st, while "Tempest" placed 15th.

Often, the show would beat its lead-in, Gilmore Girls (which saw a 60% surge in its new timeslot) in the ratings. Towards the end of the season, it was #1 with viewers under 35 in the ratings, which beat Frasier, Scrubs, and 24.

The season received mostly favorable reviews. IGN's Jeremy Conrad, who was initially against the idea of "reimagining" the Superman mythology, gave the first season a 7/10 rating. After reviewing the entire season, Conrad stated the first season of Smallville was "a solid start to what will be a great Superman TV series". Entertainment Weekly's Bruce Fretts believes the series might appear "corny" on the surface, but actually shows "subversively witty spin on the comic-book myths". Clint Morris, founder of Moviehole.net, stated that the series was "still finding its feet in season one", although, he commended the acting, citing specifically Rosenbaum's "uncontrollably likeable Lex Luthor". The Free-Lance Star's Rob Hedelt commended the casting as well, comparing Welling's portrayal of a teenage Clark Kent to that of Christopher Reeve's portrayal in the Superman film series. Hedelt considered Schneider and O'Toole to be ideal picks for Jonathan and Martha, but felt Mack and Jones III, important characters, were the weakest part of the ensemble. Judge Byun, of DVD Verdict, felt having Clark and Lex start their relationship as best friends was a "brilliant concept" that moved the show past a "Dawson's Creek with super powers" tone the premise of the show suggested. Byun believes the first season had "solid writing and excellent performances", but is weakened by the freak of the week storylines that plagued the early episodes of the season; the season works best when the episodes focus on character development and not super powers.

Other critics were less enthusiastic about the season. Peter Bowes of BBC News felt the season was simply a "soap opera" with "pretty young people". Bowes believes the season suffered from the "sentimental boy-girl storyline", but that die-hard Superman fans would still be taken in by this incarnation of the character's early years. A common criticism for the first season was the use of "villain of the week" storylines. By the time the first seven episodes aired, at least one journalist had had enough of the villain of the week format. Pittsburgh Post-Gazette's Rob Owen wrote the series works best with its "character interaction and a nice performance by John Schneider as Pa Kent", but that the show needs more than the "'monster of the week' stories seen so far". Jordan Levin, president of The WB's Entertainment division, recognized the concerns that the show had become a villain of the week series. Levin announced that season two would see more "smaller mini-arcs over three to four episodes, to get away from some of the formulaic storytelling structure" the series has fallen into.

== Awards ==
By 2003, the first season had been nominated for and won various awards. It won an Emmy Award for "Outstanding Sound Editing for a Series", and the pilot episode was nominated for "Outstanding Visual Effects for a Series". The pilot was recognized by other award organizations, receiving a Leo Award for "Best Visual Effects" in 2002. Peter Wunstorf was recognized for his work on the pilot with a nomination by the American Society of Cinematographers. Casting directors Deedee Bradley, Coreen Mayrs, and Barbara Miller were nominated for an Artios Award for their work on the pilot. Chris McGeary was nominated for Golden Reel's "Best Sound Editing in Television" award for his music editing on the pilot. The season one finale, "Tempest", was nominated for Golden Reel's "Best Sound Editing in Television Episodic" in 2003. In 2002, The American Society of Composers, Authors, and Publishers honored the band Remy Zero (which provided the opening theme song for Smallville) and composer Mark Snow for their contributions to the show; the award recognized the composers of the theme or underscore of the highest rated television series during January 1 – December 31, 2001.

Several members of the regular cast were nominated for awards. In 2001, Rosenbaum, Kreuk, and Welling were nominated for Saturn Awards for Best Supporting Actor in a Television Series, Best Actress, and Best Actor, respectively. Rosenbaum and Kreuk received additional nominations for male and female Cinescape Genre Face of the Future awards, and the entire season was nominated for Best Network Television Series. Rosenbaum was the only one to win an award (Best Supporting Actor). Welling won the Teen Choice Award for Choice Breakout TV Star—Male in 2002. Smallville's first season placed sixth on the Parents Television Council's list of the "best shows for families".

== Home media release ==
The complete first season of Smallville was released on September 23, 2003, in North America. Additional releases in regions 2 and 4 took place on October 13 and December 3, 2003, respectively. The DVD box set included various special features, including episode commentary, an interactive tour of Smallville, and storyboards from select episodes. For the 20th anniversary, the complete series was released for the first time on Blu-ray on October 16, 2021. Season one is the only season to be produced in standard-definition. The Blu-ray release contains the original standard-definition, upscaled.
