= Lana Lang (Smallville) =

Fictional character from Smallville

- Smallville character
- Kristin Kreuk as Lana Lang
- First appearance: "Pilot"; Smallville; October 13, 2001
- Last appearance: "Requiem"; Smallville; February 26th, 2009
- Based on: Lana Lang by: Bill Finger; John Sikela
- Adapted by: Alfred Gough; Miles Millar
- Portrayed by: Kristin Kreuk; Jade Unterman

Lana Lang is a fictional character on the television series Smallville. A series regular from the pilot episode, she was played by Kristin Kreuk, with two other actresses portraying Lana as a child and as an elderly woman. The character was originally created for comic books by Bill Finger and John Sikela in the 1950s as a romantic interest for Superboy, and adapted for the show in 2001 by Alfred Gough and Miles Millar. Lana Lang has also appeared in various literature based on the television series.

In Smallville, Lana is the first love interest of Clark Kent, although she is dating Whitney Fordman in the first season. By season two, with Whitney's departure, Lana and Clark begin to grow closer. Clark's dishonesty over the secrets he is hiding causes their relationship to end. Lana then grows closer to Lex Luthor, whom she marries and divorces in the sixth season. Eventually Lana learns the truth about Clark and they get back together. After stealing a kryptonite-powered suit from Lex, Lana absorbs an enormous amount of kryptonite radiation, which prohibits her from getting too close to Clark, and she leaves Smallville for good, but vows to continue to use her powers to preserve life.

Initially, Lana is characterized as the intelligent "girl next door". She eventually becomes a tragic figure in Smallville, as the decisions made by Clark and Lex change the character over the course of the show. As Gough explains, by the end of the sixth season, Lana has shown that she can beat Lex at his own game. Over the course of the show, Lana transitions from the girl next door to a more "self-reliant young woman". Kreuk was nominated for various awards for her portrayal of Lana Lang.

== Role in Smallville ==
In the first season, Lana and Clark Kent (Tom Welling) are just beginning their friendship, as she is a popular cheerleader dating star quarterback Whitney Fordman (Eric Johnson), and Clark cannot get near her without getting sick from the kryptonite necklace she wears. In the pilot episode, when her parents are killed in the first meteor shower, Lana (Jade Unterman) is adopted by her aunt Nell (Sarah-Jane Redmond). As the first season progresses, Lana grows closer to Clark, while Whitney begins to distance himself because of his father's medical ailments. In season two's episode "Heat" Lana sends Whitney, who left Smallville for the Marines in the season one finale, a video message breaking up with him. Lana's aunt Nell moves to Metropolis with her fiancé in the season two episode "Ryan", but Lana opts to move in with her friend Chloe Sullivan (Allison Mack) so that she may finish high school in Smallville.

By the end of season two, Lana and Clark slowly try and start a romantic relationship, but fear backlash from Chloe because of her personal feelings for Clark. Just as the two give in to their feelings fully, Clark unexpectedly runs away from Smallville in the season two finale. At the start of season three, it is shown that Lana, alongside the Kents, has been spending her time searching for Clark; she ultimately finds him in Metropolis thanks to Chloe's help. Clark's actions in Metropolis force the two to rethink their relationship in the season three episode "Phoenix", and Lana eventually begins a new relationship with Adam Knight (Ian Somerhalder), whom she met while in physical therapy after being trampled by a horse in season three's "Asylum". By the season three episode "Crisis", it is discovered that the relationship Adam attempted to form with Lana was just a ploy so that Adam could investigate Clark.

Season three's "Forsaken" reveals that Lana, in order to move on with her life, applies and is admitted into a program to study in Paris, France. Season four shows that Lana, while in Paris, began a romantic relationship with Jason Teague (Jensen Ackles). At the beginning of season four, Lana returns to Smallville after receiving a mysterious tattoo on her lower back, which resembles a symbol on the local Kawatche cave walls, when she touched the tomb of Countess Margaret Isobel Theroux. In season four's "Spell" and "Sacred", the tattoo acts as a doorway for the spirit of Isobel to inhabit Lana's body; each time Isobel takes over Lana's body she sets out to find the three stones of knowledge, which are also being searched for by Clark and Lex Luthor (Michael Rosenbaum). In the season four finale "Commencement", Lana is confronted by Jason's mother Genevieve (Jane Seymour), who is also after the three stones of knowledge, and during a struggle Isobel comes forward and kills Genevieve. The resulting death of Genevieve, who was revealed to have been the cause for Isobel's death centuries prior in the episode "Bound", releases Isobel's control over Lana.

During the second meteor shower (in episode 88, "Commencement"), Lana witnesses the landing of an alien spacecraft, and two alien beings emerging and killing everyone in sight in the season five premiere. The spaceship becomes Lana's primary focus in season five, officially teaming up with Lex Luthor to discover the mystery behind the ship in the episode "Splinter". When her relationship with Clark hits a breaking point in season five's "Hypnotic", she begins to grow closer to Lex. The relationship with Lex eventually leads to marriage in the season six episode "Promise", but not before Lana discovers Clark's secret and realizes why he has been lying to her all these years. When she learns that Lex set up a fake pregnancy in order to get her to marry him in the season six finale "Phantom", Lana effectively ends the marriage and fakes her own death to escape Lex after he threatens her. She also frames Lex for her murder, to punish him for his betrayal. It is revealed at the start of season seven that her effort fails, but as part of the "settlement" of their divorce, Lex makes sure that Lana does not go to jail for her actions.

With Clark's secret no longer an issue, the two begin a real relationship in the season seven episode "Fierce". Lana becomes obsessed with making Lex pay for all his crimes against humanity, which causes her to develop the Isis Foundation, using $10 million she stole from Lex. The Isis Foundation is a counseling center for kryptonite-infected people, but it doubles as a front for Lana's surveillance on Lex. Her obsessions also begin to affect her relationship with Clark by the episode "Wrath". Eventually, Lana realizes that, even though she loves him, the only way for Clark to help the world to the best of his ability would be if she left Clark and Smallville for good, which she does in the season seven finale.

In the season eight episode "Bride", Oliver Queen (Justin Hartley), believing he is tracking Lex Luthor who has been missing since the season seven finale, discovers Lana instead. Oliver convinces her to return to Smallville so that she can attend Chloe's wedding. In the season eight episode "Power", it is revealed that Lana really returned so that she could steal Lex's "Prometheus" technology for herself, which harnesses alien DNA into a nanite "super-suit" to give the wearer superhuman abilities. By the end of the episode, the procedure is complete, and Lana becomes just as strong and invulnerable as Clark. In the episode "Requiem", Lana discovers that her suit absorbs kryptonite, but also emits the radiation making her a potential danger to Clark. When Winslow Schott puts a kryptonite bomb on the roof of the Daily Planet under Lex's orders, Lana is forced to absorb all of the kryptonite to deactivate the bomb. As a result, she leaves Smallville to go on her own quest as Clark can no longer get near her without the kryptonite radiation hurting him.

== Portrayal ==
Creators Alfred Gough and Miles Millar were initially trying to find someone for the role of Clark Kent, but Kristin Kreuk was the first to be cast, as Lana Lang. Casting director Coreen Mayrs sent David Nutter, the director of the pilot episode, a tape of 69 people and the second person on the tape was Kreuk. They loved her audition tape so much they immediately showed her to the network. For one of her auditions, she read the graveyard scene with Tom Welling; the network thought they had "great chemistry". Jade Unterman and Louise Grant portrayed the character as a child and an elderly woman, respectively.

At the time she was cast as Lana, Kreuk had no idea who the character was in Superman lore. Her uncle, who owned a comic book shop, filled her in on the details and she learned more from the producers. Kreuk realized that the character in the comics and her character on the show were two different people. As a result, Kreuk learned about the development of Lana as Lana is learning in the show, just as Welling does with Clark Kent. When asked if her being cast as a traditionally red haired character caused outcry from fans, Kreuk believes that whoever did "got over it pretty fast". By season three, Kreuk had decided to "invest" herself less in her character, as she felt that her character's ultimate development was entirely in the hands of the producers. She no longer became frustrated when the producers had Lana doing things that Kreuk felt were out of character, instead trusting that they would find the right direction for the character.

Kreuk enjoyed the fourth season because it gave her the chance to stretch her acting abilities with Lana's storyline involving the spirit of Countess Margaret Isobel Thoreaux. According to the actress: "That was a lot of fun; I thought it was funny as well […] It really was wonderful to be able to stretch and play this driven woman who has a goal and is going to reach it, and in the meantime she's going to be sexy doing it. That was a lot of fun for me because the show sometimes isn't realistic so, as actors, we get to play with different types of things". Kreuk says her strangest moment on the show was playing a vampire in season five's "Thirst", an experience she remembers as "uncomfortable" due to the fake blood they covered her in.

== Character development ==
=== Storyline progression ===
One of the early turning points for the character came in season one's "X-Ray", when Lana discovers information about her parents that changes her perspective on them. It began with her mother's graduation speech, which showed that her mother was not as happy as her aunt had led her to believe. Lana's perception of her mother drove the way she led her own life, which was based on the idea of everyone perceiving her in a good light. In season two, Lana discovers that her mother had had an affair with a man named Henry Small, and that he was her biological father. This continued the idea established in season one that Lana's perception that her parents were this perfect couple was wrong. According to Kreuk, meeting her biological father allowed the character to realize that she had to create her own life, as the one she had envisioned did not actually exist.

Season two also showed Lana's transition from the "girl next door" to a more "self-reliant young woman". At the beginning of the season Lana is forced to come to terms with her diminished feelings for Whitney, as well as her growing feelings for Clark. It takes time before Lana is strong enough to finally tell Whitney the truth, in a video message, about the way she feels. The Talon, a local coffee shop co-owned by Lana, becomes her new grounding force as Whitney and her aunt have left Smallville. Kreuk thinks that it can be hard to believe that a sixteen-year-old girl could become co-owner of a coffee shop, but she believes that it helps to provide more independence for the character and establish her more within the show. Eventually, in order to really get to know herself, and find her role in life, Lana leaves Smallville for Paris. In season four, Kristin Kreuk felt like Lana is "going a little crazy and is uncertain about her direction, and feels people aren't validating her beliefs".

=== Characterization ===
At the start of the show, Lana Lang is characterized as the girl next door. As Kreuk describes her, she is the "beautiful, popular girl who is really lonely". She has a "hole in her heart", because of the loss of her parents, and feels empathy for everyone. Kreuk feels that deep down the character is a "tough girl", and that Lex manages to bring that side of her out more. For instance, he convinces her to fight back against a rival coffee shop that is spreading rumors about The Talon – the coffee shop that she joint owns with Lex. That tough side is not seen in the first season. According to Kreuk, the character was never placed in situations where she could show her outgoing side, because she was left to communicate primarily with Whitney and Clark. Kreuk thinks that Lana "lived in her head a little bit"; she was intelligent enough to read classical books, but would also read romantic novels "on the sly".

As Alfred Gough sees it, Lana is a by-product of Clark and Lex's decisions. She will always love Clark, and Clark will always love her, but it was Clark's bad decisions, and Lex's "basest instincts" that make Lana the "receptacle of all of these bad decisions", marking her as a tragic figure on the show. While Lana was with Clark, Kreuk characterizes her as a "wimpy, whiny kind of girl"; with Lex, Lana is "strong, powerful, and doesn't have to question, 'What is going on? What does he think? Does he love me? I don't know where I stand'". To clarify, Lana's relationship with Lex brings out a darkness that had not been seen in the character. This is evident in "Nemesis" when Lana manipulates her way into seeing Lionel, only to interrogate him about why he forced her to marry Lex, as well as leaving Lex to die in the tunnels. As Gough explains, by the end of the sixth season, Lana has shown that she can beat Lex at his own games.

Reviewer Jennifer Malkowski feels that Lana is one of the most gullible characters on television. According to Malkowski, Lana's strong feminist stance, and her request that people should stop protecting her and start telling her the truth, are diluted by her willingness to believe whatever pieces of information she gets, even if they are lies. After the series ended, Gough and Millar expressed regret with Lana's characterization throughout the course of the show, which they felt damaged Lana in the audiences' mind. Gough and Millar believed that Lana's behavior toward Clark (for refusing to reveal his secret) made her come across as cold and unsympathetic.

=== Relationships ===
When Smallville first began, Lana was in a romantic relationship with Whitney Fordman, the star quarterback of the football team. Kreuk believes that Lana truly was in love with Whitney when they first started dating, but by the time the audience first sees her in the pilot she is no longer in that same state of mind. Kreuk believes that by the time of the pilot Lana had grown "comfortable" with Whitney, and that was where their relationship ended. Though Lana had growing feelings for Clark, Kreuk feels that the producers rushed the coupling of Clark and Lana at the end of the second season. She believes that with everything that had happened throughout the season between the two characters, it seemed a bit of a stretch for Lana to just quickly fall into Clark's arms. The next season began to develop more of the relationship between Lex and Lana. Kreuk believes that Lana cares for Lex as a friend, and that she recognizes the "undertones" that Lex may be placing on their relationship, but that Lana tends to ignore them. Kreuk recognizes that Lex is a big part of Lana's life, and that Lana tries to pay more attention to the good that Lex does and focus less on the darker aspects of his life.

The friendship that Lana shares with Chloe was deeply damaged at the start of season three, so much so that not even Kreuk realized how badly until the episode "Truth". Lana is aware that Chloe still has romantic feelings for Clark, but their friendship suffered the most when Chloe revealed that she had known where Clark had been hiding for months. The feelings of distrust for Chloe remained hidden until "Truth"—where Chloe gained the ability to have others speak the truth no matter what—when Lana finally revealed how much she cannot trust Chloe. This developing friendship between Lex and Lana puts a strain on Lana's relationship with Clark. Just as Clark is beginning to realize the truth about Lex and his lies, Lana is starting to trust Lex more. Ultimately, it is Clark's own lack of honesty that forces Lana to leave Smallville and go to Paris at the end of season three. In the end, Kreuk believes that Clark is Lana's only true friend, as Lex is more focused on bringing his father to justice and she and Chloe have a tense relationship based on their mutual feelings for Clark.

While in Paris, Lana begins a new romantic relationship with Jason Teague. Kreuk believes that Lana did love Jason Teague, but she also still loved Clark at the same time. With Clark, it was the "first love" that she never had the chance to discover, and that lingered with her while she was in Paris during the space between seasons three and four. According to Kreuk, before Lana can experience successful relationships with other people she will need to know what it is like to truly be in a relationship with Clark, because of the "intense connection between [the] two". Allison Mack shares her insight into the relationship between Clark and Lana, believing that the pair should have remained apart until they could finally be honest with each other: "There's no honesty in their relationship, and there's no way that they could have a healthy relationship without that honesty […] You can't be with someone if you're not honest with them". Kreuk echoes Mack's sentiments, acknowledging that Lana is not stupid, and if Clark wants a real relationship then he is going to have to be honest with her.

"A part of me feels that she could never really love Lex, and that is why she can be with him: he's not capable of hurting her. She fully loved Clark, Jason, and Whitney. She loved those people. She can care about Lex and want the best for him, but I don't think she could fall blindly in love with him".

— Kristin Kreuk on Lana's relationship with Lex.

The beginning of season five saw, for the first time, Clark and Lana in a happy relationship together, one that was void of dishonesty and secrets. The return of Clark's powers in "Hidden", as well as the secrets and lies that accompany them, caused stress on their relationship. In the series' 100th episode, Clark finally took a chance and told Lana the truth. When it resulted, indirectly, in her death and he was allowed to live the day over again Clark chose not to tell her his secret. In "Hypnotic", in an effort to stop hurting Lana emotionally, Clark told her that he no longer loved her. This drove Lana into Lex's arms. Writer Darren Swimmer explains that this was not something that just happened in the series, but something that had been hinted at for many seasons. Swimmer believes that Lana started dating Lex as a way of making Clark mad, but the relationship "turned into much more". Kreuk contends that Lana went to Lex because she knows that she will never really love him. Kreuk believes that Lana's relationship with the men in her life has been motivated by a desire to fill a void in her life that was left after her parents were killed. This need to fill that emptiness was fulfilled in "Void", when Lana took a drug to induce death so that she could see her parents in the afterlife. Upon meeting her parents, Kreuk believes that Lana realized that she no longer needed someone else to fill that hole in her. Kreuk sees this filled void as the reason why Lana would gravitate toward Lex. Although she did not truly love Lex, Kreuk argues that Lex was not a rebound guy and that Lana did have feelings for him.

Even though Lana eventually marries Lex in season six, Al Gough argues that Lana still loved Clark and Clark still loved her. The only reason Lana was with Lex was because Clark forced her in that direction and she ended up getting in over her head. By contrast, writer Caroline Dries feels that Lana did love Lex, and that she did not make any hasty decisions when she agreed to marry him. Dries believes that the progression of the show demonstrates that Lex earned Lana's love. To answer viewers that hated to see Lana marry Lex, Dries contends that viewers are seeing all of Lex, including how evil he truly is, while Lana only sees the portion of Lex that appears good.

== Reception ==
In 2001, Kristin Kreuk was nominated for a Saturn Award for Best Actress, as well as Female Cinescape Genre Face of the Future. The following year, alongside co-star Tom Welling, Kreuk was nominated for a Best Actress Saturn Award again. She would receive two more nominations in that category, one in 2004 and one in 2006, before she departed from the show. In the 2003 Teen Choice Awards, Kristin Kreuk was nominated for Choice TV Actress: Drama/Action Adventure. She was nominated again in 2004, 2006, 2008 for the revised category Choice TV Actress: Action Adventure, and finally in 2009. Kreuk was also co-nominated with Welling at the 2006 Teen Choice Awards for Most Beautiful Couple (TV - Choice Chemistry).

DVD Verdict's Brian Byun felt that the casting of the series was "pitch-perfect", noting that Kreuk is "painfully luminous" as Lana Lang, which makes it obvious why she is the object of Clark's obsession.

== Other media appearances ==
=== Young adult novels ===
Lana makes her first literary appearance in Smallville: Strange Visitors, published by Aspect. In Strange Visitors, Lana attempts to organize a fund raiser for the family of a school mate, Stewart, who was diagnosed with terminal cancer. Her effort is rendered moot when Lex Luthor and Dr. Donald Jacobi, a con artist that comes to Smallville, pick up Stewart's medical bills after a meteor rock removes all of the malignant cancer cells in his brain. In Smallville: Dragon, Lana visits an antiques dealer, Mrs. Mayfern, looking for a gift for her boyfriend, Whitney. When she leaves she breaks up with Whitney and starts dating Clark. It is eventually discovered that she was hypnotized by Mrs. Mayfern, whose homegrown herbal tea is fertilized by meteor rocks.

=== Comic books ===
Lana made a non-speaking cameo appearance in the ninth issue of the show's comic book continuation Smallville: Season Eleven, written by executive story editor Bryan Q. Miller. Though Clark and Bart Allen do not notice her, she watches them race over the coast of Cameroon. Lana returns in a parallel story arc Valkyrie in which she uses the superhero alias "Angel of the Plateau" and battles terrorists in Africa. Lana also saves Lois from one of their attacks. Lana reveals that she has been using her abilities to help and protect children from people who would exploit them after Lana had settled in Africa. Lois, however, tries not to reveal her relationship with Clark to Lana. Elsewhere, the terrorists seek John Corben's aid in defeating Angel of the Plateau. Corben's new kryptonite heart (installed by Winslow Schott) has absorbed the nanites embedded in Lana's skin, rendering her powerless and no longer emitting the kryptonite radiation once more. After Lois helps Lana defeat Corben, Lana reveals that she had seen Lois's engagement ring, thus she already knows about Clark's relationship with Lois. Lana gives her blessing to Lois, and decides to remain in Africa as the Angel.
