= Lionel Luthor =

Fictional character from Smallville

- Smallville character
- John Glover as Lionel Luthor
- First appearance: "Pilot"; Smallville; October 16, 2001
- Last appearance: "Finale"; Smallville; May 13, 2011
- Created by: Alfred Gough; Miles Millar
- Portrayed by: John Glover

In-universe information
- Relatives: Lex Luthor (son); Tess Mercer (daughter); Lucas Luthor (son); Julian Luthor (son, deceased); Eliza Luthor (mother); Lachlan Luthor (father)

Lionel Luthor is a fictional character portrayed by John Glover in the television series Smallville. The character was initially a special guest in season one, and became a series regular in season two and continued until being written out of the show in season seven. The character returned to the show in season ten again in a special guest role as a parallel universe version of the character. In Smallville, Lionel Luthor is the father of Lex Luthor (Michael Rosenbaum), and founder and CEO of LuthorCorp. Lex Luthor's father was first introduced in Superman comics by Jerry Siegel in 1961 and has since appeared in other Superman-related media under different names. Smallville is the first appearance in which the character has been an intricate part of a Superman adaptation. Series developers Alfred Gough and Miles Millar created Lionel Luthor for Smallville to provide an antithesis to the parenting style of Jonathan Kent (John Schneider) and Martha Kent (Annette O'Toole). In the DC Comics, Lex Luthor's father was originally named Jules Luthor, but later was renamed Lionel Luthor some time after Smallville. He debuted in Superman's Girlfriend, Lois Lane #23 (February 1961) and was created by Jerry Siegel and Kurt Schaffenberger.

During the story of Smallville, Lionel evolves from being a nemesis of Clark Kent (Tom Welling) who develops multiple schemes to uncover Clark's secrets, to becoming an ally who eventually dies to protect Clark's secret from his own son. Lionel has a strained relationship with Lex and regularly tries to test him. He attempts to develop a romantic relationship with Martha Kent after inadvertently causing the death of Jonathan Kent, helping her advance toward the United States Senate. A parallel universe version of the character is later introduced in the show's final season who serves as Clark and his allies' adversary and plays a pivotal role in bringing Lex back from his presumed death.

Lionel's development from a main antagonist to an ally was difficult for the writers who felt the character's arc failed to achieve the status they wanted. Although they continued with the story arc, Lionel returned to using deception to protect Clark rather than exploit him. He is characterized as a sinister character who tried hard to further his own ambitions. Lionel's relationship with his son has been likened to that of Harry Osborn and Norman Osborn from Spider-Man comics.

== Role in Smallville ==
=== Earth-1 version ===
In 1989, Lionel visits Smallville to buy the Ross Creamed Corn company immediately before a meteor shower occurs. Twelve years later during season one, Lionel exiles his son Lex Luthor (Michael Rosenbaum) to Smallville to run LuthorCorp's local fertilizer plant as a test. When Lex makes a profit for the first time in years, Lionel closes the plant and blames Lex's poor managerial skills. Lionel later confronts his son at the Luthor mansion when Lex tries to orchestrate an employee buyout to save the fertilizer plant. When strong winds force debris to smash through the mansion, Lionel is pinned under a fallen support beam and Lex hesitates to save his father. In season two, Lex saves Lionel but Lionel loses his sight because of Lex's judgment to rush into surgery. Lionel is initially shown as blind until Lex and Lucas Luthor (Paul Wasilewski)—Lionel's illegitimate son—devise a plan to uncover Lionel's deception; it's revealed that Lionel was blind but that his eyes healed and he intentionally neglected to tell anyone so he could watch how they acted around him. Lionel is later aware of the Kawatche caves and tries to unlock the mysterious symbols there, to the dismay of Clark Kent (Tom Welling). Season three revealed that Lionel conspired with Morgan Edge (Rutger Hauer) to murder Lionel's parents and used the insurance money to fund LuthorCorp. Lionel has Lex committed to a mental institution, after Lex discovers what Lionel did. When Chloe Sullivan (Allison Mack) discovers the truth, her evidence is used to assist Lex in having Lionel arrested for the murder. It is also revealed that Lionel is hates Lex because he blames his son for the death of his youngest son Julian Luthor, although Lex took the blame to protect the true killer Lillian (Alisen Down), Lionel's mentally unwell wife. Lionel also learns that he has a terminal liver disease, which he divulges to Lex while awaiting arraignment.

Lionel is sentenced to prison for his parents' murder in season four. Lionel attempts to switch bodies with Lex using a stone from Clark's homeworld of Krypton but Clark intervenes and Lionel switches bodies with Clark instead. When he and Clark switch back, Lionel discovers his terminal liver disease is healed. Lionel is released from prison by Genevieve Teague (Jane Seymour), and begins searching for three stones of knowledge. During this quest, Lionel falls into a catatonic state after being uploaded with Kryptonian knowledge. Lionel recovers in season five when Jor-El's artificial intelligence takes over his body to speak with Clark. Under Jor-El's guidance, Lionel begins helping Clark by making excuses for Clark's behavior and unexplained disappearances throughout seasons five and six. Season seven revealed that Lionel and three other wealthy families formed the secret society Veritas to protect an alien visitor known as the Traveler (Clark) and that Lionel murdered the other members. Lionel also has Clark kidnapped and tortured. Lex realizes Lionel has been covering up the Traveler's existence and kills him. Season ten reveals that Tess Mercer (Cassidy Freeman) is Lionel's illegitimate daughter fathered with Pamela Jenkins (Donna Bullock).

=== Earth-2 doppelgänger ===
Season ten featured an alternate doppelgänger of the character when Clark unintentionally visits a parallel universe where Lionel found and adopted Clark's doppelgänger to be a murderer going by the alias of Ultraman before escaping back to his own reality but is followed by Lionel. Lionel posed as his own doppelgänger as he assumes control of LuthorCorp from Tess and attempts twice to groom "Alexander Luthor"/Conner Kent (Lucas Grabeel) to his side. However, Lionel fails to bring the hybrid clone of Clark and Lex to his side and loses the company when Tess proves he's an imposter. The series finale revealed that Lionel discovers the original Lex had transplanted body parts from Lex's replicates and was kept hidden. He founded the genetic research company PreClox as he embezzled a large amount of money from LuthorCorp to assist Lex's scientists with a compatible heart. Lionel tries to give Tess's heart to Lex but Tess shoots Lionel and escapes. Lionel surrenders his soul to Darkseid, giving Lionel's heart to effectively resurrecting Lex. Darkseid possesses Lionel's corpse to attack Clark who destroys Lionel's body and dispels Darkseid's threat.

== Portrayal ==
Lionel Luthor was created by Alfred Gough and Miles Millar specifically for Smallville to provide a parallel to the Kents as an "experiment in extreme parenting". The character Chloe Sullivan (Allison Mack) was also created for the show. Lex's father has previously been depicted in other media.

Lionel Luthor is portrayed in the program by John Glover; Glover said he appreciates the "clear canvas" he had to work with when developing his portrayal of Lionel. In season one, Glover traveled from New York to Vancouver every week while filming his scenes because he was already committed to stage appearances in New York at the time. When portraying the character's struggle with terminal liver disease, Glover was inspired by a friend's battle with cancer; he said his friend was a "cheerleader to people", who supported and boosted others when they were feeling bad. When Glover's friend learned he had cancer he fought hard to get over it, but when he learned that it was terminal he went to bed and stopped eating until he died about ten days later. This helped Glover understand how someone powerful and full of life could commit suicide—which Lionel prepares to do when he learns his illness is terminal.

== Character development ==
=== Storyline progression ===
In season two, Lionel moves from being recurring figure to a regular character. This season features the gradual unveiling of Lionel's increasing involvement with the characters of the show. It begins with more direct involvement when Luthor hires Martha Kent as his assistant, and then indirectly when he becomes the conservator of the Kawatche caves and tries to unlock the mystery of the symbols on the cave walls. During season three, Lionel becomes the villain of the show when he tries to discover Clark's secret and drives Lex into a psychotic breakdown. This allows Lionel to use electroshock therapy on Lex to erase his knowledge of Lionel's co-opting of Morgan Edge to kill Lionel's parents for their life insurance. The creative team experimented with Lionel's character in season four, creating a storyline in which Lionel is reformed. Executive producer Greg Beeman said the character development failed, and as a result Lionel returned to his normal self. John Glover found playing Lionel as a straight arrow was "boring".

Season five explores the relationship between Martha and Lionel. Both Annette O'Toole and Al Gough said Lionel was slightly attracted to Martha, but that she would never act on that feeling. The producers had no intentions to create a romantic relationship between the two characters. Most of Lionel's motivations in season five are shrouded in mystery. Glover said he could not determine whether his character is good or bad, so when he is portraying him in season five he tried to present everything as if it was "good". Glover said he believes Lincoln Cole's (Ian Tracey) actions in "Mercy" made Lionel rethink everything his past behavior and his own character. By the end of the fifth season, Lionel has learned that people have a responsibility to each other.

Smallville's writer and executive producer Brian Peterson said the creative team wanted to remind the audience that Lionel was still the same Lionel Luthor they had come know, so they delayed revealing Lionel's usual antics until season six's "Promise" in which he blackmails Lana into marrying Lex. Peterson wanted to "slap [the audience] in the face" with a reminder of Lionel's former character. Although Lionel blackmails Lana into marrying Lex, John Glover said Lionel was trying to protect Clark, for which he needed Lana's help. By the time season six began airing, Glover realized Lex was starting to become more villainous and that his time on the show would be limited. Glover hoped Lionel would still be able to influence his son as the show progressed; he believed his character would be useless on the show without such influencing abilities. Glover said the conflict between Lex and his father is very positive for the show because Lionel's attempt to bond with Lex and the distrust between them "makes drama".

=== Characterization ===
Glover characterizes Lionel as a businessman who is disappointed with his son. To Glover, Lionel is this "rich and powerful businessman" who sees his son as a "wuss" and "fraidy-cat". It was important to Glover that Lionel appear as human as possible; Glover said he does not want to simply "twirl [his] mustache". Glover described Lionel as a man who will do whatever he needs to do to get what he wants. He characterizes Lionel as an intelligent man who can read people easily. Lionel uses that ability to further his goals. The character can also get past people's defenses and manipulate them. Glover thinks that type of power would be great if it could be used to help someone other than Lionel. Lionel's character is also connoted by the color scheme that surrounds him; the use of cold blue tones helps to evoke the "sinister" nature of the character. Lionel is also often portrayed in front of a white or "clinical blue" background. Lionel's signature mane of hair is used to symbolize his power—by growing it out and refusing to style it, Lionel attempts to show he is so powerful that he can do whatever he wants without any backlash.

=== Relationships ===
The relationship between Lionel and his son Lex is strained; it has been likened to the relationship between Norman and Harry Osborn in the Spider-Man film. Glover tried to make Lionel appear as though he is trying to "toughen [Lex] up". The character is made to "go out of his way, to give [Lex] tests, so [Lex] can prove himself". Glover sees the character as a rich and powerful businessman who is disappointed in his son. Glover's goal for season one was to show Lionel's attempts to make Lex tougher; he interprets the character's motto in his raising of Lex as "no risk, no rewards".

What I was working on, and continue to work on, is to see him strengthen Lex. Lionel doesn't seem to be a man who wants his son to be afraid, so he's gone out of his way to give him tests, so he can prove himself. That's what locking him inside the plant in "Jitters" was all about. Lionel makes the decision to close the gate. It's a tough decision, but he knows that if Lex survives, he will be a stronger person. No risk, no reward.

— Glover explains Lionel's parenting techniques

Glover believes Lionel has two competing agendas with Lex—for Lex to become his own man and for Lex to follow in his father's steps. This becomes frustrating for Lex because Lionel wants his son to be both "loyal follower" and the "best person he can be". This all plays into Lionel's "pretty huge ego". John Glover believes if Lionel and Lex were not related Lionel would have "destroyed" Lex early on because he views his son as "weak". Lionel is also bound by the fact that Lex is his heir, although he does not trust Lex. Lionel's distrust of Lex partially arises because he believes Lex is a coward. John Glover said: "It's not that Lionel is meant to be a foe; it's just that the poor boy's weak, so Lionel must mold him. Lionel is continually trying to strengthen his son, to teach him. Lex is just a hard student".

Lionel also has a key relationship with Martha Kent, Clark Kent's adoptive mother. This relationship first develops in season two when Lionel hires Martha to be his assistant; it is further developed in season five. Glover felt Lionel's attraction to Martha grows in season five when Jonathan Kent dies because he now sees Martha as a single woman and is now more attainable; Glover believes Lionel was seeking to attain Martha's "goodness" and the attraction is not based on lust. When Lionel is in Martha's company he tries to present himself as a man she could be with; he consciously attempts to change years of selfish behavior. Writer Holly Harold said his relationship with Martha parallels Lex's relationship with Lana; both men believe these two women will be their saving grace and pull them back from the dark side. Annette O'Toole said Martha's interest in Lionel is like watching a dangerous animal: "It's that attraction you have for a very beautiful, dangerous animal. You know you can't stop watching it, but at the same time you feel, 'Oh my God, he's going to kill me'". O'Toole also said she believes Martha's motivation is to get close enough to Lionel to know what he is planning to do to Clark. When Martha left the show, writer Todd Slavkin said they wanted to give the character "more of a send-off" than they achieved on screen. Slavkin said they could do nothing equivalent to what they gave John Schneider because there were so many storylines by the season six finale they could fit nothing else in. The writers realized they could not kill off the character so they sent her to the U.S. Senate, creating a parallel to Clark where Martha fights injustice on the political stage. O'Toole and Al Gough said Martha has a small attraction to Lionel and that nothing serious would come from it.

Glover believes Martha influenced Lionel to start believing that sacrifice is necessary to make the world a better place. When she leaves at the end of season six, Lionel no longer has that influence. He is constantly battling the dark and light sides of his personality. According to series writer Caroline Dries, the audience never really know his motivations because of this balancing act. Dries said this is embodied when he threatens Lana into marrying Lex, later revealing it was to protect Clark. Glover describes his off-screen relationship with Annette O'Toole the reason Martha and Lionel have such good chemistry. Glover said that when Martha and Lionel are talking to each other it feels as though he and O'Toole are sharing a conversation, and that trust is visualized on the camera.

=== Reception ===
For his portrayal of Lionel Luthor on Smallville, John Glover was nominated for two Saturn Awards in the category of Best Supporting Actor in a Television Series. The first came in 2003, following his upgrade to series regular status, and the second in 2004. By season four, one reviewer said Lionel should have left the show after succumbing to his terminal liver disease in season three. Maurice Cobbs of DVD Verdict said Lionel was taking away from the primary characters' screen time in season four, and the producers should have killed him at the end of season three.

== Smallville tie-ins ==
=== Novels ===
Lionel makes his first appearance outside the television series in the Aspect book Smallville: Strange Visitors. In this title, Lionel is concerned that confidence trickster Donald Jacobi will draw too much attention to the meteor rocks in Smallville and ruin his plans to use the rocks for experiments. Lionel has the life of Jacobi's partner put in jeopardy when he threatens to alert some mobsters who are looking for Lionel. He makes a brief appearance in Smallville: Dragon, in which he tells Lex he used Lex's ex-girlfriend Renata to get close to Lex to test him for unknown reasons. The Smallville version of Lionel makes a brief appearance in the second volume of the internet series Smallville: Chloe Chronicles; he threatens Chloe after she discovers he is involved with the deaths of several people.

=== Comics ===
In the television series' comic book continuation written by the show's writer Bryan Q. Miller, it is revealed that Lionel had tried to recruit Bruce Wayne's father Thomas Wayne into the secret society Veritas with Virgil Swann, months prior to Wayne and his wife's mugging and murder by Joe Chill.

== In other media ==
=== Film ===
- In Richard Donner's Superman: The Movie and Bryan Singer's Superman Returns, Lex briefly mentions his father—but not his father's name—as the inspiration of Lex's real estate schemes. Lex also says that his father was a harsh man who ejected him from the family home.
- In Zack Snyder's Batman v Superman: Dawn of Justice, Lex is named after his father, Alexander Luthor Sr., the founder of LexCorp and an oil and machinery tycoon immigrant from East Germany who died in 2000. When confronting Superman, Lex mentions his father's abusive behavior in his childhood.

=== Television ===
- In the 1988–1992 television series Superboy, Lex's father appears in season four's "Know Thine Enemy" (Part 1), in which Superboy becomes Lex Luthor in a virtual reality and watches Lex grow up with an abusive father; Lex's father is unnamed and is portrayed by Edgar Allan Poe IV.
- Lionel Luthor appears in a flashback of the Supergirl episode "Luthors", portrayed by Ian Butcher. He is a billionaire and the founder of his family's company LuthorCorp as well as resembling the future Lex Luthor (Jon Cryer) with his baldness. It is revealed that sometime after marrying Lillian (Brenda Strong) and having Lex, Lionel began an affair with a woman named Elizabeth Walsh that would lead to the conception of Lena Luthor (Katie McGrath). Once Lillian discovered the affair, he ultimately chooses to remain with his family. After the death of Lena's mother, Lionel takes in his illegitimate daughter but lies to her and the public that his second child is adopted. Lionel favors Lena over Lex due to his love for her mother, leading to tension with his wife and son, especially due to his emotional distance from Lex growing up. Lionel also became an alcoholic later in his life, contributing to his family's dysfunction. Lionel died sometime afterwards due to unknown circumstances and Lex inherited his father's fortune to lead LuthorCorp for years until his imprisonment. Lena then takes over leadership of LuthorCorp, relocates the company's headquarters from Metropolis to National City, and renames it L-Corp, attempting to redeem her family name from Lex's actions. When Lena learns her true paternity from Lillian, she becomes determined to restore the Luthor name for both her father and herself.
- Lionel Luthor appears in the Titans episode "Conner", portrayed by Peter MacNeill. This version is almost blind and a former scientist. Conner and Krypto arrive at Lionel's Kansas house upon a memory drawing him to it. He told Conner everything about his son and Clark before Conner is ambushed by Mercy Graves' Cadmus team. Conner works to protect Lionel from the Cadmus team after he gets attacked by one of the soldiers. The next day, Mercy gives Lex a status report while also mentioning that his father is doing alright.
- Lionel Luthor briefly appears in a flashback sequence in the Superman & Lois episode "Break the Cycle", portrayed by Colin Decker. Dialogue reveals that he was an abusive husband and father who abandoned Lex when he was only seven.

=== In comics ===
- Before Smallville, Lex's father either made brief appearances in the Superman comics or was mentioned. Lex's father first appears in Superman's Girl Friend, Lois Lane #23 (1961), in the story "The Curse of Lena Thorul!", written by Superman co-creator Jerry Siegel. In this story, he is named Jules, has disowned his criminal son Lex, and changed the family name to "Thorul". Jules Thorul and his wife Arlene are later killed in a car accident.
- In the 1989 graphic novel Lex Luthor: The Unauthorized Biography, Lex's unnamed father was an alcoholic who lived in the Suicide Slums of Metropolis with his wife and son Lex and regularly abused them. Later, it is revealed and implied that Lex had him killed for his insurance money which then helped him to create LuthorCorp, similar to Lionel Luthor's origin story in Smallville in which he pulled the same scheme on his parents.
- In the 2004 miniseries Superman: Birthright, Lex's father is not a billionaire but immediately puts Lex to work making millions for him after he discovers his son's astronomical IQ. Lex's father dies in a fire caused accidentally by Lex in an experiment that causes Lex's permanent hair loss.
- In the comic book series Countdown to Final Crisis (2007), Lionel Luthor is depicted as the founder and owner of LuthorCorp who lives in Metropolis with his son Lex and wife Leticia. When Lex becomes a teenager, Lionel leaves him under the care of his aunt Lena in Smallville whilst he himself lives in Metropolis until his death after which Lex inherits the company and becomes the new owner.
- In the 2007 Booster Gold comic book series, an alternate timeline version of Lionel Luthor appears in which he is a travelling salesman who adopts a baby Kal-El and raises him as his own son, favoring him over Lex. After Lionel's death, Lex finds out that his brother has superpowers and kills him in a fit of rage and jealousy.
- In Final Crisis: Legion of 3 Worlds (2009), Lionel Luthor is briefly seen in his Smallville farmhouse having a volatile argument with a teenage Lex about the way he treated his wife and Lex's mother and what Lex did to his sister Lena.
- In Adventure Comics #6 (March 2010), Lex's father (not named) terrorizes Lex and Lena. He dies of a heart attack, leaving Lena in the care of an aunt and causes Lex to leave Smallville. It is later revealed that Lex had caused his father's heart attack to cash in a sizable life insurance policy, which he would use as the basis for his fortune, the same plot Lionel used on his own parents in the Smallville backstory and what Lex himself used on his parents in Lex Luthor: The Unauthorized Biography.
- In Blackest Night #6, Lionel Luthor is revived as a member of the Black Lantern Corps.
- Lionel Luthor appears with Lex Luthor in the Flashpoint reality where they tour General Sam Lane's facility of aliens.
- The character was mentioned several times by Lex, though unnamed, in many titles seen in The New 52. He officially appeared as Lionel Luthor in a flashback scene during DC Rebirth, along with his wife Leticia.
