= James Marshall (director) =

Canadian television producer and director

James Marshall (born 1962) is a Canadian television producer and director, best known for his work on Smallville, Dead Like Me, The O.C. and Wednesday.

== Career ==
On the TV series Smallville, Marshall had an important role throughout the history of the show. When Greg Beeman stopped directing high-profile Smallville episodes (due to his commitment to Heroes), series creators Alfred Gough and Miles Millar began to look to Marshall, who first began directing on Smallville during the second half of the first season. After producing Smallville for many years, starting in season seven, Marshall became an executive producer on the show. With this position, Marshall began directing fewer episodes, and in season nine he directed zero episodes, returning to directing once in season 10.

== Filmography ==
Television show	Notes
Viper	8 episodes
The Sentinel	4 epsisodes
Just Deal	Episode: "Incoming"
In a Heartbeat	Episode: "Hero"
The Famous Jett Jackson	3 episodes
The Nightmare Room	Episodes: "Camp Nowhere" Parts I and II
Caitlin's Way	Episode: "Truant"
Charmed	Episode: "The Eyes Have It"
Birds of Prey	Episode: "Split"
Black Sash	Episode: "Pilot"
Dead Like Me	Episode: "Reaping Havoc"
Tarzan	Episode: "Emotional Rescue"
The O.C.	Episodes: "The Secret" and "The Strip"
North Shore	Episode: "Surprise Party"
Smallville	Director: 26 episodes; Producer: 149 episodes
Charlie's Angels	Episodes: "Bon Voyage", "Angels" and "Black Hat Angels"
Falling Skies	Episode: "Collateral Damage"
Shadowhunters	Episode: "Malec"
Supergirl	Episode: "Survivors"
Aftermath	Episodes: "A Clatter and a Chatter" and "Madame Sosostris"
The Shannara Chronicles	6 episodes
Into the Badlands	Episodes: "Carry Tiger to Mountain" and "Black Wind Howls"
Wednesday	Episodes: "If You Don't Woe Me by Now" and "A Murder of Woes"
