= Pete Ross =

Fictional character in the DC universe

Publication information
- Publisher: DC Comics
- First appearance: Superboy #86 (January 1961)
- Created by: Leo Dorfman; George Papp

In-story information
- Full name: Peter Joseph Ross
- Species: Human
- Team affiliations: Legion of Super-Heroes
- Supporting character of: Superboy; Superman

Peter Ross is a fictional character appearing in American comic books published by DC Comics.

== Publication history ==
The character was created by Leo Dorfman and George Papp, and first appeared in Superboy #86 (January 1961).

== Fictional character biography ==
=== Silver Age ===
Pete Ross in The New Adventures of Superboy #9 (September 1980). Art by Kurt Schaffenberger.

Pete was the childhood best friend of Clark Kent in Smallville. One night when they were camping together, Pete secretly saw Clark changing into Superboy to attend to an emergency. Pete kept his knowledge of the superhero's secret identity to himself, even avoiding revealing his discovery to Clark. Pete resolved to use this knowledge to help his friend, for example by creating a distraction to allow Clark to slip away from a dangerous situation without raising suspicion.

The Legion of Super-Heroes were aware of Pete's assistance to Clark and made him an honorary member during his teenage years. It is stated that Pete Ross's knowledge of Superboy's secret identity will eventually save Superman's life, with the Legion allowing him to keep his knowledge.

As an adult, Pete became a widower with a son named Jonathan, who also learned the secret of Superman's secret identity. When Jonathan was kidnapped by an alien race, Pete revealed to Clark his knowledge of his friend's dual identity, imploring Superman's help. When Clark was unable to provide this help, Pete suffered a nervous breakdown and attempted to discredit his former friend. Pete resided in a mental institution until his son was eventually saved.

==== Pocket Universe ====
Following Crisis on Infinite Earths, Superman did not become a superhero until he was an adult and Superboy never existed. The Legion of Super-Heroes remained dependent on Superboy's existence as its primary inspiration. In an attempt to resolve the paradox, a Superman/Legion story was crafted, explaining that a version of the Silver Age Superboy and his supporting characters inhabit a pocket universe created by the Time Trapper. Following the death of the pocket universe Superboy, Lex Luthor is tricked into releasing Kryptonian criminals General Zod, Quex-Ul and Zaora from the Phantom Zone. They decimate Earth, with Pete Ross being killed.

=== Modern Age ===
The modern version of Pete is a far more minor character in the Superman comics, who eventually married Lana Lang, with the two having a son, Clark. Peter Ross, although the relationship is occasionally strained due to Lana's knowledge of Clark's secret and Pete feeling that he was fundamentally Lana's second choice. The two are presently divorced, even after briefly reuniting following the Ruin storyline. Pete was Vice President of the United States under Lex Luthor and briefly served as President following Luthor's impeachment but quickly resigned.

In the modern comic book continuity, Pete was not initially aware of Clark's secret. Instead, the secret was known by the villainous Manchester Black, who informed Lex Luthor of the secret, only later to wipe his memory of it. Prior to losing the knowledge of Clark's secret, Lex informed Pete that his close friend Clark Kent is Superman. While Pete initially refrained from telling Clark about his knowledge, he did eventually tell him in Adventures of Superman #641.

It appeared that Ross had become a villain named Ruin, but it was later revealed that he had instead been kidnapped by the real Ruin, Emil Hamilton. Hamilton also kidnapped Pete's wife and child. Superman defeated Hamilton, rescued Pete, Lana, and their child, and exonerated Pete of the charges against him.

Pete has returned to Smallville without Lana to raise their son. He was seen attending the funeral of Jonathan Kent.

During the "Blackest Night" storyline, Pete works at Smallville's general store.

==== The New 52 ====
In 2011, "The New 52" rebooted the DC universe. Pete has only had minor appearances.

== Other versions ==
- An alternate universe version of Pete Ross appears in Amalgam Comics as an alias of Spider-Boy.
- An alternate universe version of Pete Ross, Pyotr Roslov, appears in Superman: Red Son. This version is an illegitimate son of Joseph Stalin and head of the KGB who is later turned into a "Superman Robot" by Superman after conspiring with Batman to assassinate Superman.

== In other media ==
=== Television ===
- Pete Ross makes a non-speaking cameo appearance in the Superman: The Animated Series pilot episode "The Last Son of Krypton".
- Pete Ross appears in Smallville, portrayed by Sam Jones III. This version resents the Luthor family for their perceived theft of his family's creamed corn business and is aware of Clark Kent's secret identity. In the third season, the FBI interrogates Ross for information about Clark, causing him to move to Wichita to live with his mother for his own safety. By the seventh season episode "Hero", he found work as a roadie for OneRepublic.

=== Film ===
- Pete Ross appears in films set in the DC Extended Universe (DCEU), portrayed by Jack Foley as a child and Joseph Cranford as an adult.
  - First appearing in Man of Steel, this version is initially a bully to Clark Kent before befriending him after he saves him and a group of children from a bus crash. He later grows up to become the manager of an IHOP.
  - Ross makes a cameo appearance in Batman v Superman: Dawn of Justice as an attendee of Superman's funeral.
- An alternate universe variant of Pete Ross appears in Justice League: Gods and Monsters, voiced by Larry Cedar.
- A young Pete Ross appears in Superman: Man of Tomorrow, voiced by Cristina Milizia.

=== Video games ===
- Pete Ross appears in DC Universe Online, voiced by Mike Smith.
- Pete Ross appears as a character summon in Scribblenauts Unmasked: A DC Comics Adventure.
