= I Spit on Your Grave (film series) =

American rape and revenge film series

- Created by: Meir Zarchi
- Original work: I Spit on Your Grave (1978)
- Years: 1978–2019

Films and television
- Film(s): List of films

I Spit on Your Grave is an American rape and revenge film series that comprises two films written and directed by Meir Zarchi and three remake films. Each installment follows a woman who exacts revenge on her tormentors after being assaulted by four men and left for dead. The original 1978 film has gained a large cult following. Jennifer Hills (portrayed by Camille Keaton and Sarah Butler) is the only character to appear in every film, with the exception of the 2013 film I Spit on Your Grave 2.

== Films ==
Film	U.S. release date	Director	Writer(s)	Producer(s)
I Spit on Your Grave	November 22, 1978	Meir Zarchi	Meir Zarchi	Joseph Zbeda
I Spit on Your Grave	May 1, 2010	Steven R. Monroe	Stuart Morse	Lisa M. Hansen and Paul Hertzberg
I Spit on Your Grave 2	August 25, 2013	Steven R. Monroe	Thomas H. Fenton and Neil Elman	Lisa M. Hansen and Paul Hertzberg
I Spit on Your Grave III: Vengeance Is Mine	October 23, 2015	RD Braunstein	Daniel Gilboy	Lisa M. Hansen and Paul Hertzberg
I Spit on Your Grave: Deja Vu	April 23, 2019	Meir Zarchi	Meir Zarchi	Jan O'Connell and Terry Zarchi

=== Original series ===
==== I Spit on Your Grave (1978) ====
After a young writer (Camille Keaton) is brutally raped and left for dead by four men, she systematically hunts them down one by one to exact a terrible vengeance.

==== I Spit on Your Grave: Deja Vu (2019) ====
Forty years after a woman (Camille Keaton) gets revenge on her attackers, she faces the wrath of the families of the men she killed. She and her daughter (Jamie Bernadette) are kidnapped and have to face off against a gang of degenerates overseen by a violently unhinged matriarch.

=== Remake series ===
==== I Spit on Your Grave (2010) ====
Jennifer (Sarah Butler), a writer, rents an isolated cabin in the country so she can work on her latest novel. The peace and quiet is soon shattered by a gang of local thugs who rape and torture her, then leave her for dead. But she returns for vengeance, trapping the men one by one. Jennifer inflicts pain on her attackers with a ferocity that surpasses her own ordeal.

==== I Spit on Your Grave 2 (2013) ====
A young woman (Jemma Dallender) embarks on a merciless path of revenge after three men rape and torture her.

==== I Spit on Your Grave III: Vengeance Is Mine (2015) ====
After joining a therapy group for rape victims, a woman (Sarah Butler) seeks grisly revenge against the perpetrators of the crimes.

== Derivative works ==
The first film was followed by a slew of imitators and unofficial followups, including the unofficial remakes Turkish I Spit on Your Grave from 1979 and 1985's Naked Vengeance. Naked Vengeance film inspired the name of the unofficial sequel to the original film named Savage Vengeance (also called I Will Dance On Your Grave: Savage Vengeance) which starred Keaton once again as a woman named Jennifer. Other derivatives include the spoof I Spit Chew On Your Grave (2008) and the German I Piss on Your Cadaver (1999).

== Principal cast and characters ==
List indicators

This section includes characters who will appear or have appeared in more than two films in the series.

- An empty grey cell indicates the character was not in the film, or that the character's official presence has not yet been confirmed.
- ^{A} indicates an appearance through archival footage or audio.
- ^{V} indicates a voice-only role.
- ^{Y} indicates a younger version of the character.

Character	Original series		Unofficial film	Remake series		
Character	I Spit on Your Grave	I Spit on Your Grave: Deja Vu	I Will Dance On Your Grave: Savage Vengeance	I Spit on Your Grave	I Spit on Your Grave 2	I Spit on Your Grave III: Vengeance Is Mine
Character	1978	2019	1993	2010	2013	2015
Jennifer Hills Angela Jitrenka	Camille Keaton	Camille Keaton	Camille Keaton	Sarah Butler		Sarah Butler
Johnny Stillman	Eron Tabor	Mentioned	Mentioned	Jeff Branson	Mentioned	Jeff Branson^{A}
Matthew Duncan	Richard Pace	Mentioned	Mentioned	Chad Lindberg	Mentioned	Chad Lindberg^{A}
Stanley Woods	Anthony Nichols	Mentioned	Mentioned	Daniel Franzese	Mentioned	Daniel Franzese^{A}
Andy Chirensky	Gunter Kleemann	Mentioned	Mentioned	Rodney Eastman	Mentioned	Rodney Eastman^{A}
Becky Stillman	Alexis Magnotti	Maria Olsen				
Melissa Stillman	Tammy Zarchi	Tammy Zarchi				
Johnny Stillman Jr.	Terry Zarchi	Terry Zarchi				
Waitress	Traci Ferrante					
Porter	William Tasgal					
Butcher	Isaac Agami					
Supermarket Girl	Ronit Haviv					
Christina "Christy" Hills		Jamie Bernadette				
Priest		Meir Zarchi				
Herman Duncan		Jim Tavare				
Scotty Chirensky		Jeremy Ferdman				
Beady Eyes Duncan		Alexandra Kenworthy				
Kevin Woods		Jonathan Peacy				
Millie Stillman		Holgie Forrester				
Henry Stillman		Roy Allen III				
Bar Singer			Melissa Moore			
Tommy			Donald Farmer			
Sam			Linda Lyer			
Dwayne Chesney			Phil Newman			
Sheriff			Jack Clout			
Dr. Luna			Robin Sinclair			
Clerk			Jane Clark			
Manny			Bill Sweeney			
Bulldog			Jack Kent			
Earl				Tracey Walter		
Storch				Andrew Howard		Andrew Howard^{A}
Mrs. Storch				Mollie Milligan		
Chastity				Saxon Sharbino		Mentioned
Girl at Gas Station				Amber Dawn Landrum		
Katie Carter					Jemma Dallender	
Ivan					Joe Absolom	
Ana					Mary Stockley	
Father Dimov					Valentine Pelka	
Sharon					Kacey Barnfield	
Georgy					Yavor Baharov	
Nicolai					Aleksandar Aleksiev	
Detective Kiril					Georgi Zlaterev	
Valko					Peter Silverleaf	
Jayson					Michael Dixon	
Bar Patron					Dimo Alexiev	
Pedestrian					Ivan Ivanov	
Policeman					Krasimir Ortakchiev	
Marla Finch						Jennifer Landon
Oscar "Koza" Kosca						Doug McKeon
Detective McDylan						Gabriel Hogan
Therapist						Harley Jane Kozak
Detective Boyle						Michelle Hurd
Matthew						Russell Pitts
Chief						Walter Perez
Lynne						Karen Strassman
Ron						Christopher Hoffman

== Additional crew and production details ==
Film	Crew/Detail					
Film	Composer(s)	Cinematographer	Editor	Production companies	Distributing companies	Running time
I Spit on Your Grave (1978)	—N/a	Yuri Haviv	Meir Zarchi	Cinemagic Pictures	The Jerry Gross Organization	1hr 42mins
I Spit on Your Grave (2010)	Corey Allen Jackson	Neil Lisk	Daniel Duncan	CineTel Films	Anchor Bay Entertainment	1hr 48mins
I Spit on Your Grave 2	Corey Allen Jackson	Damian Bromley	Kristina Hamilton-Grobler	CineTel Films	Anchor Bay Entertainment	1hr 46mins 1hr 40mins (edited cut)
I Spit on Your Grave III: Vengeance Is Mine	Edwin Wendler	Richard Vialet	Ana Florit	CineTel Films	Anchor Bay Entertainment	1hr 31mins
I Spit on Your Grave: Deja Vu	—N/a	Pedja Radenkovic	Terry Zarchi	Deja Vu LLC	Deja Vu LLC	2hrs 28mins

== Reception ==
=== Box office and financial performance ===
Film	Box office gross			Box office ranking		Budget	Ref.
Film	North America	Other territories	Worldwide	All time North America	All time worldwide	Budget	Ref.
I Spit on Your Grave (2010)	$93,051	$1,185,599	$1,278,650	#39	not available	$2,000,000	
I Spit on Your Grave 2 (2013)	$809	$677,795	$678,604	#52	not available	$2,000,000	
I Spit on Your Grave III: Vengeance Is Mine (2015)	$144,661			#91	not available	$2,000,000	
Totals	$91,784,027	$19,355,221	$67,215,435			$6,000,000	

=== Critical and public response ===
Film	Rotten Tomatoes	Metacritic
I Spit on Your Grave (1978)	51% (35 reviews)	19/100 (6 reviews)
I Spit on Your Grave (2010)	32% (63 reviews)	27/100 (14 reviews)
I Spit on Your Grave 2	0% (8 reviews)	23/100 (3 reviews)
I Spit on Your Grave III: Vengeance Is Mine	0% (27 reviews)	40/100 (2 reviews)
I Spit on Your Grave: Deja Vu	0% (15 reviews)	27/100 (14 reviews)

== Home media ==
Title	Format	Discs	Region 1	Region 2	Region 4	Special features	Distributors
I Spit on Your Grave: Ultimate Collector's Edition	Blu-ray	02	—	20 September 2010	—	Content New Special Features	101 Films
I Spit on Your Grave: Limited Collector's Edition	Blu-ray	03	—	7 February 2011	—	Content New Special Features	101 Films
I Spit on Your Grave (2010)	Blu-ray	01	—	8 February 2011	—	Content New Special Features	Starz/Anchor Bay Entertainment
I Spit on Your Grave: Director's Cut	Blu-ray	02	—	16 March 2011	—	Content New Special Features	Starz/Anchor Bay Entertainment

== See also ==
- Rape and revenge films
- List of film series with five entries
