= I Spit on Your Grave (disambiguation) =

I Spit on Your Grave is a 1978 American rape and revenge film.

I Spit on Your Grave may also refer to:

- I Spit on Your Grave (film series), an American rape and revenge film series
  - I Spit on Your Grave (2010 film), an American rape and revenge film, a remake of the 1978 film
- I Spit on Your Grave (1959 film), a French crime drama film, based on the novel (below)

== See also ==
- I Spit on Your Grave 2, a 2013 sequel to the 2010 film
- I Spit on Your Grave III: Vengeance Is Mine, 2015
- I Spit on Your Grave: Deja Vu, a 2019 sequel to the 1978 film
- I Spit on Your Graves, a 1946 novel by Boris Vian
