= Sex of the Witch =

- Directed by: Angelo Pannaccio
- Screenplay by: Angelo Pannaccio; Franco Brocani
- Starring: Susanna Levi; Jessica Dublin; Sergio Ferrero; Camille Keaton; Franco Garofalo
- Cinematography: Maurizio Centini; Girolamo La Rosa
- Edited by: Marcello Malvestito
- Music by: Daniele Patucchi
- Production company: Produzione Cinematografica Universalia
- Release dates: 18 October 1973 (France); 20 March 1974 (Italy)
- Running time: 81 minutes
- Country: Italy
- Box office: ₤72.169 million

Sex of the Witch (Italian: Il sesso della strega) is a 1973 Italian erotic gothic horror giallo film directed by Angelo Pannaccio and starring Susanna Levi, Jessica Dublin, Sergio Ferrero, Donald O'Brien, and Camille Keaton (of I Spit on Your Grave fame).

== Plot ==
Sir Thomas Henry, patriarch of a wealthy family, dies and his relatives gather for the reading of his will. It states that if any of the family members die, the old man's wealth will be divided equally among the survivors. One by one, his relatives start turning up dead.

== Cast ==
- Susanna Levi as Mary
- Jessica Dublin as Evelin
- Sergio Ferrero as Ingrid / Uomo
- Camille Keaton as Ann
- Franco Garofalo as Tony (credited as Christopher Oakes)
- Donald O'Brien as Commissario (credited as Donal O'Brien)
- Gianni Dei as Simon
- Augusto Nobile as Edward
- Maurizio Tanfani as Nath
- Marzia Damon as Gloria
- Irio Fantini as Ass. Ispettore Marchi
- Ferruccio Viotti as Notaio Thompson
- Giovanni Petrucci as Johnny (credited as Giovanni Petti)
- Annamaria Tornello as Ingrid (credited as Tornello Annamaria)
- Simone Santo as Sir Thomas Hilton
- Lorenza Guerrieri as Lucy

== Production ==
Shooting on the film began on March 6, 1972 in Sermoneta. Donald O'Brien stated that the budget was so low on Sex of the Witch that he had to pay for his own food and hotel room during production. Actress Camille Keaton also admitted not knowing the film's plot on set, and when she confessed this to another actor, he claimed the same amount of confusion.

== Release ==
Sex of the Witch was released in France before it was released in Italy as Les Anges Pervers ("Perverse Angels") on 18 October 1973. It was distributed theatrically in Italy by Regional on 20 March 1974. The film grossed a total of 72,169,000 Italian lire domestically.

== Sources ==
- Curti, Roberto (2017). Italian Gothic Horror Films, 1970–1979. Jefferson, North Carolina: McFarland. ISBN 978-1-476-62960-5.
- Curti, Roberto (2017). Riccardo Freda: The Life and Works of a Born Filmmaker. Jefferson, North Carolina: McFarland. ISBN 978-1-476-62838-7.
- Gomarasca, Manlio (April 2003). "Una vita da cattivo. Intervista a Donal O'Brian [sic]" [A life as a villain. Interview with Donal O'Brian]. Nocturno Cinema (in Italian). No. 10. p. 50.
- Kessler, Christian (March 1996). "Gunslingers, Cannibals and More...:An Interview with Dolan O'Brien". European Trash Cinema. No. 16.
