= List of horror films of 1974 =

A list of horror films released in 1974.

Title	Director(s)	Cast	Country	Notes	Ref.
Abby	William Girdler	William Marshall, Carol Speed, Terry Carter	United States		
The Antichrist	Alberto De Martino	Mel Ferrer, Arthur Kennedy, Carla Gravina, George Coulouris	Italy		
Bad Ronald	Buzz Kulik	Scott Jacoby, Pippa Scott, John Larch, Dabney Coleman, Kim Hunter	United States	Television film	
The Bat People	Jerry Jameson	Robert Berk, Paul Carr	United States		
The Beast Must Die	Paul Annett	Peter Cushing, Michael Gambon, Tom Chadbon	United Kingdom		
Beyond the Door	Ovidio G. Assonitis	Juliet Mills, Gabriele Lavia, Richard Johnson	Italy	Alternative title(s): Diabolica; The Devil Within Her	
Black Christmas	Bob Clark	Olivia Hussey, Margot Kidder	Canada		
Blood for Dracula	Paul Morrissey	Joe Dallesandro, Udo Kier, Vittorio De Sica	United States		
The Bloody Exorcism of Coffin Joe	José Mojica Marins	José Mojica Marins	Brazil		
Blue Eyes of the Broken Doll	Carlos Aured	Paul Naschy, Diana Lorys, Maria Perschy	Spain	Alternative title(s): House of Psychotic Women; House of Doom	
Captain Kronos – Vampire Hunter	Brian Clemens	Horst Janson, Shane Briant, Caroline Munro	United Kingdom	Alternative title(s): Kronos; Vampire Castle	
The Cars That Ate Paris	Peter Weir	John Meillon, Terry Camilleri, Chris Haywood	Australia		
Chosen Survivors	Sutton Roley	Jackie Cooper, Alex Cord, Richard Jaeckel	United States; Mexico		
Count Dracula's Great Love	Javier Aguirre	Paul Naschy, Rosanna Yanni	Spain		
Craze	Freddie Francis	Jack Palance	United Kingdom		
Deathdream	Bob Clark	Richard Backus, John Marley, Lynn Carlin	United States	Alternative title(s): Dead of Night	
The Demoniacs	Jean Rollin	Joëlle Coeur, John Rico, Willy Braque	France		
Deranged	Jeff Gillen, Alan Ormsby	Roberts Blossom, Cosette Lee	United States		
The Devil's Plaything	Joseph W. Sarno	Marie Forså, Nadia Henkowa, Flavia Keyt	Sweden; Switzerland; West Germany	Alternate title: Vampire Ecstasy	
Don't Open the Door!	S. F. Brownrigg	Susan Bracken, Annabelle Weenick, Jeffrey Swann	United States	Alternative title(s): Don't Hang Up	
The Eerie Midnight Horror Show	Mario Gariazzo	Stella Carnacina, Chris Avram, Ivan Rassimov	Italy	Alternative title(s): Enter the Devil; The Sexorcist; The Devil Obsession	
Exorcismo	Joan Bosch	Paul Naschy	Spain		
Flavia: Heretic Priestess	Gianfranco Mingozzi	Anthony Higgins, Florinda Bolkan, Claudio Cassinelli	France; Italy		
Frankenstein and the Monster from Hell	Terence Fisher	Peter Cushing, Shane Briant, Madeline Smith	United Kingdom		
Frightmare	Pete Walker	Kim Butcher, Fiona Curzon	United Kingdom		
From Beyond the Grave	Kevin Connor	David Warner, Nyree Dawn Porter, Donald Pleasence	United Kingdom		
The Gardener	James H. Kay	Joe Dallesandro, Katharine Houghton	United States	Alternative title(s): Seeds of Evil; Garden of Death	
The Ghost Galleon	Amando De Ossorio	Manuel de Blas, Blanca Estrada	Spain	Alternative title(s): Ghost Ships of the Blind Dead; Horror of the Zombies; Ship of Zombies; Zombie Flesh Eaters	
The Hand That Feeds the Dead	Sergio Garrone, Yilmaz Duru	Carmen Silva, Klaus Kinski, Ayhan Işık	Italy		
Horror High	Larry N. Stouffer	Austin Stoker, Rosie Holotik, Pat Cardi	United States		
The House of Seven Corpses	Paul Harrison	John Ireland, Faith Domergue, John Carradine	United States		
The House on Skull Mountain	Ron Honthaner	Mary J. Todd McKenzie, Ella Woods	United States		
House of Whipcord	Pete Walker	Patrick Barr, Ray Brooks	United Kingdom		
Impulse	William Grefe	William Shatner, Ruth Roman, Harold Sakata	United States	Alternative title(s): Want a Ride, Little Girl?	
The Infernal Trio	Francis Girod	Michel Piccoli, Romy Schneider, Mascha Gonska, Philippe Brizard	France; Italy; West Germany	Alternative title(s): Le Trio infernal	
It's Alive!	Larry Cohen	John P. Ryan, Sharon Farrell, Andrew Duggan	United States		
Kill Barbara with Panic	Celso Ad. Castillo	Susan Roces, Rosanna Ortiz, Dante Rivero, Mary Walter	Philippines		
Killdozer!	Jerry London	Carl Betz, Neville Brand	United States	Television film	
The Legend of the 7 Golden Vampires	Roy Ward Baker	David Chang, Peter Cushing, Shih Szu	United Kingdom; Hong Kong	Alternative title(s): 7 Brothers Meet Dracula; Dracula and the 7 Golden Vampires; The Seven Brothers Meet Dracula	
Let Sleeping Corpses Lie	Jorge Grau	Cristina Galbó, José Lifante, Fernando Hilbeck	Italy; Spain	Alternative title(s): The Living Dead at the Manchester Morgue	
Lisa and the Devil	Mario Bava	Telly Savalas, Elke Sommer	Italy; Spain; West Germany		
Lisa, Lisa	Frederick R. Friedel	Leslie Lee, Jack Canon, Ray Green	United States	Alternative title(s): Axe; California Axe Massacre; California Axe Murders; The Axe Murders; The Virgin Slaughter	
Lorna the Exorcist	Jesús Franco	Pamela Stanford, Guy Delorme, Lina Romay	France		
Lucifer's Women	Paul Aratow	Larry Hankin, Jane Brunel-Cohen, Norman Pierce	United States	Alternative title(s): Svengali the Magician; Svengali	
Madeleine: Anatomy of a Nightmare	Roberto Mauri	Camille Keaton, Riccardo Salvino	Italy		
Madhouse	Jim Clark	Vincent Price, Natasha Pyne, Peter Cushing	United Kingdom		
Moonchild	Alan Gadney	Victor Buono, Janet Landgard, John Carradine	United States		
Night of the Sorcerers	Amando De Ossorio	Simón Andreu, Kali Hansa	Spain		
Nude for Satan	Luigi Batzella	Rita Calderoni, Renato Lupi, Barbara Lay	Italy		
People Toys	Sean MacGregor	Sorrell Booke, Joan McCall	United States	Alternative title(s): Devil Times Five; The Horrible House on the Hill; Tantrums	
Persecution	Dan Chaffey	Lana Turner, Olga Georges-Picot, Shelagh Fraser	United Kingdom	Alternative title(s): The Terror of Sheba	
The Phantom of Hollywood	Gene Levitt	Skye Aubrey, Jack Cassidy, Jackie Coogan, Broderick Crawford, Peter Haskell, John Ireland, Peter Lawford	United States	Television film	
Phantom of the Paradise	Brian De Palma	Paul Williams, William Finley	United States		
Prophecies of Nostradamus	Toshio Masuda	Tetsurō Tamba, Toshio Kurosawa, Kaoru Yumi, Yoko Tsukasa	Japan		
Reflections of Murder	John Badham	Tuesday Weld, Joan Hackett, Sam Waterston	United States	Television film	
Seizure	Oliver Stone	Roger DeKoven	United States		
Shanks	William Castle	Marcel Marceau, Tsilla Chelton, Philippe Clay	United States		
The Stranger Within	Lee Philips	Barbara Eden, George Grizzard, Joyce Van Patten, David Doyle, Nehemiah Persoff	United States	Television film	
Sugar Hill	Paul Maslansky	Marki Bey, Robert Quarry, Don Pedro Colley	United States	Alternative title(s): Voodoo Girl; The Zombies of Sugar Hill	
Symptoms	José Ramón Larraz	Angela Pleasence, Lorna Heilbron, Peter Vaughan	United Kingdom	Alternative title(s): The Blood Virgin	
The Texas Chain Saw Massacre	Tobe Hooper	Marilyn Burns, Gunnar Hansen, Allen Danziger	United States	First film of The Texas Chainsaw Massacre franchise	
The Thirsty Dead	Terry Becker	Judith McConnell, Vic Diaz, Jennifer Billingsley	Philippines; United States		
Vampyres	José Ramón Larraz	Anulka Dziubinska, Karl Lanchbury, Bessie Love	United Kingdom		
Voodoo Black Exorcist	Mañuel Cano	Eva Leon, Aldo Sambrell	Spain		
Young Frankenstein	Mel Brooks	Gene Wilder, Peter Boyle, Marty Feldman, Cloris Leachman, Teri Garr, Kenneth Mars, Madeline Kahn	United States		

== Sources ==
- Albright, Brian (2012). Regional Horror Films, 1958-1990: A State-by-State Guide with Interviews. Jefferson, North Carolina: McFarland. ISBN 978-1-476-60042-0.
- Chibnall, Steve; Petley, Julian, eds. (2002). British Horror Cinema. New York City: Routledge. ISBN 978-0-415-23003-2.
- Deal, David (2007). Television Fright Films of the 1970s. Jefferson, North Carolina: McFarland. ISBN 978-0-786-42929-5.
- Dendle, Peter (2010). The Zombie Movie Encyclopedia. Jefferson, North Carolina: McFarland. ISBN 978-0-7864-9288-6.
- Hardy, Phil, ed. (1995). The Overlook Film Encyclopedia. Vol. 3. Overlook Press. ISBN 0-87951-624-0.
- Muir, John Kenneth (2007). Horror Films of the 1970s. Jefferson, North Carolina: McFarland. ISBN 978-0-786-49156-8.
- Paul, Louis (2015). Italian Horror Film Directors. Jefferson, North Carolina: McFarland. ISBN 978-0-786-48749-3.
- Pitts, Michael R. (2014). Columbia Pictures Horror, Science Fiction and Fantasy Films, 1928-1982. Jefferson, North Carolina: McFarland. ISBN 978-0-786-45766-3.
- Shipka, Danny (2011). Perverse Titillation: The Exploitation Cinema of Italy, Spain and France, 1960-1980. Jefferson, North Carolina: McFarland. ISBN 978-0-786-48609-0.
- Young, R. G. (2000). The Encyclopedia of Fantastic Film: Ali Baba to Zombies. Hal Leonard Corporation. ISBN 1-55783-269-2.
