= List of Israeli films of 1962 =

A list of films produced by the Israeli film industry in 1962.

== 1962 releases ==
Premiere	Title	Director	Cast	Genre	Notes	Ref
?	Sinaia (Hebrew: סיניה)	Ilan Eldad, Ivan Longyel		Drama		
?	Ba'al Hahalomot (Hebrew: בעל החלומות)	Alina Gross, Yoram Gross		Drama, Animation		
?	Nini (Hebrew: ניני)	Shlomo Suriano		Drama		
?	Etz O Palestina (Hebrew: עץ או פלסטיין)	Uri Zohar, Nathan Axelrod, Joel Silberg	Haim Topol	Documentary		
Early 1962	What a Gang/ Havura Shekazot (Hebrew: חבורה שכזאת)	Ze’ev Havatzelet	Shaike Ophir, Ilana Rovina	Youth comedy		

== See also ==
- 1962 in Israel
