= Savage Vengeance =

- DVD release poster
- Directed by: Donald Farmer
- Written by: Donald Farmer
- Produced by: Barney Griner
- Starring: Vickie Kehl; James Cochran; Melissa Moore
- Cinematography: Donald Farmer
- Edited by: Donald Farmer
- Music by: Perry Monroe
- Production company: Tapeworm
- Distributed by: Eden Entertainment; Magnum Video; Massacre Video
- Release date: October 27, 1993
- Running time: 65 minutes
- Country: United States
- Language: English
- Budget: <$6,000

Savage Vengeance is a 1993 American rape and revenge film written and directed by Donald Farmer. It stars Camille Keaton (under the alias "Vickie Kehl") as Jennifer, a reference to Keaton's earlier role as Jennifer Hills in I Spit on Your Grave. For this reason, the film is often considered an unofficial sequel to that film. The film also had alternative titles such as I Will Dance on Your Grave, I Will Dance on Your Grave: Savage Vengeance, and I Spit on Your Grave 2: Savage Vengeance.

== Plot ==
A woman named Jennifer goes to a park where she is raped and left for dead by four men. Five years later, Jennifer, now in law school, is exposed by her law professor when he reveals to the class her past. She was tried for murder, but pleaded not guilty. Angry, she decides to take a little vacation with her friend, Sam.

When they stop for gas, Sam is harassed by a strange local man named Tommy, who had previously murdered a woman who spurned his advances at a bar. Tommy is brushed off by the gas station clerk Dwayne, who playfully flirts with Sam. When Jen and Sam arrive at their cabin, Sam is disgusted by the place and takes a walk. When night falls, she is lost but quickly finds a cottage. She is surprised to find out Dwayne owns the place. Dwayne attacks and rapes her before Tommy, who is revealed to be a friend of his, shows up and stabs her to death.

The next day, Jennifer goes back to the gas station looking for Sam. Instead, she is greeted by Dwayne and Tommy, who tell her they know where Sam is. After taking Jennifer to their cottage, they reveal Sam's corpse. Jennifer escapes the cottage and runs into the woods, but is caught by Dwayne. After Dwayne rapes her, Tommy then stabs her in the chest, leaving her for dead. Jennifer survives the ordeal, hitchhikes, and plans her revenge.

A little while later at the gas station, the sheriff questions Dwayne and Tommy about the missing women, but they deny everything. Dwayne is then told by a friend at a bar that a woman matching Jennifer's description recently bought weapons and has been asking about him around town. Dwayne later takes a walk in the woods and is attacked by Jennifer, who slices his head in half with a chainsaw. Meanwhile, Tommy is back at his cottage, taking care of both Sam's and a woman's dead bodies as if they were alive. Jennifer chases him out of the cottage and shoots him in the groin with a shotgun and walks away, leaving Tommy to die in agony.

== Cast ==
- Camille Keaton (credited as 'Vicki Kehl') as Jennifer
- Donald Farmer as Tommy
- Linda Lyer as Sam
- Phil Newman as Dwayne Chesney
- Jack Clout as Sheriff
- Robin Sinclair as Dr. Luna
- Jane Clark as Clerk
- Bill Sweeney as Manny
- Jack Kent as Bulldog
- Melissa Moore as Bar singer

== Production ==
According to the director's commentary on the 2013 DVD release of the film, director Donald Farmer met actress Camille Keaton while shooting his film, Cannibal Hookers, through a mutual friend. In 1988, Farmer was signed on as the casting director of the film No Justice and was in charge of finding celebrities to cast in the film. Farmer states he intended to put Keaton into as many films as possible. No Justice was shot in the spring of 1988, and Savage Vengeance was shot in the fall of 1988.

Farmer claimed on a podcast that he pitched a film idea entitled Savage Vengeance to film producer Mel Lieberman of Lettuce Entertain U. The storyline would have involved Keaton's character as a detective cop who would kill criminals. Lieberman instead hired Farmer to write and direct what would be Savage Vengeance. The film's budget is estimated to be less than $6,000. It was shot in Tennessee on video.

The film was completed and shelved for five years until Magnum Video approached Farmer to include two of his films in a Grave Dancer collection.

In 2013 a special edition DVD was released by Massacre Video, including a rare interview with actress Camille Keaton.

== Remake ==
The film received a remake in 2020 that was distributed by SRS Video. Donald Farmer was the producer and played a law professor.

== Reception ==
The authors Joseph A. Ziemba, Annie Choi, and Zack Carlson criticized the film for being "light on thrills and even lighter on kills". They wrote, "Mostly the film consists of extended rape scenes that aren't particularly exploitative; they pale in comparison to those in I Spit on Your Grave. The assaults in Savage Vengeance are just uninspired devices that fail at disturbing the viewer." In a positive review, Dan Tabor of Cinapse called the film "the Troll 2 of rape/revenge films", writing, "It's a film that, while hilariously bad, had more interesting drama going on behind the scenes than in front of the camera."
