= I Spit on Your Grave 2 =

- Theatrical release poster
- Directed by: Steven R. Monroe
- Written by: Thomas Fenton; Neil Elman
- Produced by: Lisa M. Hansen; Paul Hertzberg
- Starring: Jemma Dallender; Yavor Baharov; Joe Absolom; Aleksandar Aleksiev; Mary Stockley; Valentine Pelka
- Cinematography: Damian Bromley
- Edited by: Kristina Hamilton-Grobler
- Music by: Corey Allen Jackson
- Production company: CineTel Films
- Distributed by: Anchor Bay Films
- Release dates: August 25, 2013 (Film4 FrightFest); September 20, 2013 (United States)
- Running time: 106 minutes 100 minutes (Edited cut)
- Country: United States
- Languages: English; Bulgarian
- Box office: $668,119

I Spit on Your Grave 2 is a 2013 American rape and revenge film directed by Steven R. Monroe. It is a standalone sequel to the 2010 film I Spit on Your Grave, also directed by Monroe, which in turn was based on Meir Zarchi's 1978 film. The film stars Jemma Dallender, Joe Absolom, Yavor Baharoff, Aleksander Aleksiev and Mary Stockley.

The film was given a limited theatrical release at one theater, and was also received negatively by critics. It is also the only film in the franchise not to feature an American cast, or the series main protagonist Jennifer Hills.

It was followed by I Spit on Your Grave III: Vengeance Is Mine (2015).

== Plot ==
Katie Carter is a model in New York City who works part-time as a restaurant receptionist to make ends meet. Desperate to update her modeling portfolio, she answers an advertisement offering a free photography session. She then meets three Bulgarian siblings, photographers Ivan, Nicky and Georgy, who becomes infatuated with Katie. She leaves the photoshoot after disagreeing with Ivan about a topless shot. At Katie's apartment Georgy apologizes for Ivan and hands her a flash drive containing her photos.

That night, Katie wakes to find Georgy filming her, so she shocks him in self-defense. Georgy binds, gags and sodomizes her. Katie's neighbor, Jayson, intervenes but Georgy stabs him to death. Nikolay and Ivan arrive and clean up all evidence of the crime. Ivan then force-feeds Katie ketamine, rendering her unconscious.

Katie wakes and finds herself naked and handcuffed to a pipe in a basement as the brothers relentlessly rape and torture her. She overpowers Georgy and escapes, but discovers that she's now in an unknown city. When she approaches Bulgarian police, she's taken into safe custody by Detective Kiril, who informs her that she's been kidnapped and taken to Sofia, Bulgaria's capital city. After an interview, Detective Kiril hands her over to Ana, who claims to be from a rape crisis center but is really Nikolay and Georgy's mother. Katie is returned to the basement and Valko, the father of a family friend, electroshocks her genitals then brutally rapes her. Ivan then beats her after she slaps his face.

Katie is then placed in a box with her crucifix necklace and Valko's electroshock gun and buried alive, thus her rapists believe that she will die. Unbeknownst to them, the ground beneath the makeshift coffin breaks and she falls into the sewer system below. Naked, bloodied, bruised and hungry, Katie makes her way through the tunnels until she finds some old dirty clothes which she wears and finally arrives at a nearby church convent where she takes food and is soon found by its rector, priest Dimov, who recognizes her as a rape survivor. In an act of kindness, he offers her food, water, clean clothing, and a Bible and helps her recover from her injuries. Katie approaches the U.S. Embassy, but leaves before going inside. Back at the church, the priest offers support to her again. As Katie goes back to the sewers, she leaves her Bible open for Dimov to read. After reading the passage "vengeance is mine", Dimov realizes that Katie seeks revenge against her rapists.

Katie first steals money from Ana's house and buys clothes, weapons, and supplies. She then lures Georgy into the sewers, captures him and hangs him by his arms on the wall. She tortures him with a large switchblade and smears fecal matter into his wounds to cause infection, then leaves him to die slowly. Meanwhile, Dimov contacts Kiril and informs him of Katie's condition and her intention to seek revenge on her attackers, and Kiril realizes that she's still in trouble. Both men aim to stop Katie and persuade her that she would have legal justice. At a nightclub, Katie laces Nikolay's drink with ecstasy. He runs to the bathroom where she suffocates him in an unflushed toilet. The next day, Valko sees Katie during a church service and chases after her into the basement, where Katie strikes him with a rock. When he regains consciousness, he's strapped to a metal bed frame. Katie electroshocks his genitals with a stun stick and shoves a large plumber's snake down his throat. She then attaches electrical cables to the bed and electrocutes him.

Ana discovers the burglary, but Katie pushes her into the sewers and binds her to watch Georgy die. Ivan realizes that Katie has escaped; she captures him, ties him to a table and tortures him by crushing his testicles until they rupture. Kiril hears Ivan and Ana's screams and follows them to the sewers. During the torture, Ivan reveals that Ana is his stepmother, who herself was raped by her future husband, Ivan's father, while Nikolay and Georgy were products of Ana's rapes. Katie understands Ana's sadistic nature and begins to torture Ana and Ivan, but at that moment, Kiril arrives and holds Katie at gunpoint. Ivan grabs and begins to strangle Katie, but Kiril kills Ivan, allowing Katie to escape, apologizing for failing her. As Ana, the sole survivor, is arrested by Kiril for her part in her family's crimes, Katie leaves and takes refuge at the U.S. Embassy.

== Cast ==
- Jemma Dallender as Katie Carter
- Yavor Baharov as Georgy Patov
- Joe Absolom as Ivan Patov
- Aleksandar Aleksiev as Nikolay Patov
- Mary Stockley as Ana Patov
- Valentine Pelka as Father Dimov
- Georgi Zlaterev as Detective Kiril
- Peter Silverleaf as Valko
- Michael Dixon as Jayson
- Kacey Barnfield as Sharon
- Dimo Alexiev as Bar patron
- Ivan Ivanov as Pedestrian
- Krasimir Ortakchiev as Policeman

== Production ==
Filming began in Sofia, Bulgaria, in November 2012.

== Release ==
When seen by the British Board of Film Classification in a rough cut form for a video classification, Anchor Bay was informed that 27 cuts were needed to secure an 18 certificate for the film. The film was given a limited theatrical release in the United States on September 20, 2013, followed by an immediate home media release on DVD and Blu-ray on September 24. The uncut version (106 minutes) is available in Region 1 territories while the BBFC "18" version is sold in the UK in Region 2.

In Germany just like the previous film, the sequel was placed on the List of Media Harmful to Young People restricting the access to adults only.

In the US, the film was given a theatrical release in only one theater for one week. At the box office, the film made US$809. Internationally, it grossed $587,648 in Russia, $10,485 in Singapore, and $79,662 in Turkey.

=== Critical response ===
Critical response to the film was very negative. All eight reviews on the website Rotten Tomatoes are negative, resulting in a rating of 0%. Dennis Harvey of Variety wrote that the film is "exactly the kind of bottom-feeding exploitation trash one expected the last time around". Kim Newman of Screen Daily wrote, "Monroe's first working-over of this material was at least competent, but this is, at once, too ugly to laugh at and too ridiculous to take seriously." Annlee Ellingson of the Los Angeles Times wrote that the film starts off promising but degenerates into a "mound of toxic trash". Serena Whitney of Dread Central rated it 2/5 stars and wrote, "Although the initial premise is frightening and the film is competently shot, I Spit on Your Grave 2 pales in comparison to the original remake." Pat Torfe of Bloody Disgusting rated it 2.5/5 stars and wrote, "Everything about this film feels like a 'been there, done that' deal, and largely, that's what it is."

== Sequel ==
In March 2015, Anchor Bay Entertainment announced I Spit on Your Grave III: Vengeance Is Mine, the third installment of the film series. Sarah Butler returned to her role as Jennifer Hills and R.D. Braunstein served as director of the film. It was released on DVD and Blu-ray on October 20, 2016.
