= Artifacts (film) =

- Directed by: Giles Daoust; Emmanuel Jespers
- Written by: Giles Daoust
- Starring: Mary Stockley; Felix Scott; Véronique Vandeven
- Music by: Ernst W. Meinrath
- Release date: October 20, 2007 (Hollywood Film Festival)
- Running time: 75 minutes
- Country: Belgium
- Language: English

Artifacts is a 2007 horror film directed by Giles Daoust and Emmanuel Jespers and starring Mary Stockley and Felix Scott. It was released in the United States by Lionsgate Films.

== Plot ==
Kate (Mary Stockley) is a workaholic with a failing relationship with her boyfriend. One night after falling asleep she dreams of one of her friends being thrown from a building by an unseen assailant. The police come to her the next day and reveal to her that her friend has, in fact, died. Kate, for a moment begins to wonder if she is responsible. She then realizes that it was not she who killed her friend, but her friend's double. One by one Kate's friends are hunted downed and killed with strange 'artifacts' removed from their bodies by their attackers. Kate then teams up with her boyfriend in hopes that they can escape the same fate.

== Accolades ==
Released in the US under Lionsgate DVDs, Artifacts had very little (if any) fanfare. A trailer was created and was printed on most of Lionsgate's then current releases. Artifacts has received four film festival awards: 'Official Selection at the Hollywood Film Festival', 'Winner of the Platinum Award at the Worldfest Houston International Independent Film Festival', 'Official Selection at the Brussels International Festival of Fantastic Film', and 'Official Selection at Fantasporto'.

== Critical reception ==
DVD Talk praised the film, noting good acting and a "compelling" unbloated plot while criticising its open-ended ambiguous ending, and rated it "highly recommended". DVD Verdict was less keen, saying "there's not much happening here", praising the acting and visuals while criticising the plot. Dread Central gave the film 3/5, calling it "good for a quick watch" but "forgettable", and giving the DVD special features, a documentary featurette on the making of the film, 1/5. Cinema Fantastique gave it 2/5, finding the scenario simplistic and the film direction repetitive.
