= I Spit on Your Grave: Deja Vu =

2019 American horror film

- Promotional poster
- Directed by: Meir Zarchi
- Written by: Meir Zarchi
- Produced by: Jan O'Connell; Terry Zarchi
- Starring: Camille Keaton; Jamie Bernadette; Maria Olsen; Meir Zarchi
- Cinematography: Pedja Radenkovic
- Edited by: Terry Zarchi
- Production company: Deja Vu LLC
- Distributed by: Deja Vu LLC
- Release date: April 23, 2019 (United States)
- Running time: 148 minutes
- Country: United States
- Language: English

I Spit on Your Grave: Deja Vu is a 2019 American rape and revenge film written and directed by Meir Zarchi. It stars Camille Keaton and Jamie Bernadette, and is a direct sequel to Zarchi's infamous 1978 film I Spit on Your Grave.

== Plot ==
40 years after the events of the previous film, Jennifer Hills wrote a best-selling memoir based on her rape and has become a successful rape counselor. Her daughter, Christy Hills, is a successful supermodel, having been one since the age of 10. The families of Jennifer's rapists and subsequent victims have begun their plan for revenge. The gang consists of Johnny's wife, Becky Stillman; Johnny's parents, Millie and Henry Stillman; Matthew's grandmother, Beady Eyes Duncan; Matthew's father, Herman Duncan; Andy's cousin, Scotty Chirensky; and Stanley's brother, Kevin Woods.

Christy meets Jennifer at a restaurant, where she expresses her desire to leave modeling and pursue something more challenging. When the two leave, Kevin and Scotty kidnap the two women and take them to the country. Becky meets up with them and expresses her anger that they brought Christy instead of just Jennifer. Kevin and Becky take Jennifer to the site where she hanged Matthew, while Scotty drives Christy to an unknown location. Jennifer is forced to dig a hole while listening to classical music (due to Johnny being killed with classical music playing in the background) but manages to escape by using the shovel as a weapon and stealing a gun.

Meanwhile, Christy convinces Scotty to pull over on the premise of her needing to use the restroom, Scotty telling her to go into the woods. Scotty becomes suspicious that she takes too long and goes to find her. Christy knocks him out with a short tree branch, steals the truck, and drives back to the house to find her mother. Jennifer is greeted by a strange woman on a bicycle and is then picked up by an odd, old couple.

Jennifer is dropped off at a church, which she finds to be locked. Becky finds her and, after forcing her to beg for her life, decapitates Jennifer. Christy arrives moments later, finds her mother dead and tries to find help. Unsuccessful at finding help, she goes back to her mother's corpse, only to see a truck driving away with Jennifer's body. Becky comes back and chases Christy into the woods, where she is attacked by Herman and Kevin, who tear her clothes off. Kevin knocks her out and rapes her. As she walks away, Becky and Scotty arrive, and Becky begins to rape her, but Herman manages to stop the rape, allowing Christy to run away. The gang gives chase after yelling at Herman.

The gang go to the graves of their relatives and celebrate their victory before dumping Jennifer's body into a grave. Christy wakes up the next morning and steals clothes from a house. She finds Herman's house where she steals food and kills him by surprise with a sickle before shooting him. Becky orders Kevin and Scotty to find Christy. The two go looking for Christy and find Herman's car pulled over by the side of the road. When Kevin goes out to investigate, Christy ambushes him with a gun and orders him to strip (much like her mother did with Johnny). She then seduces him and gives him a handjob before stabbing him in the testicles with a broken beer bottle. Scotty comes after hearing Kevin's screams and is shot in the groin by Christy. Scotty pleads for his life (much like his cousin) and is anally raped by Christy using the gun before she shoots him through his rectum.

Unable to reach the rest of the gang, Becky goes out to find them. She finds Herman's, Scotty's, and Kevin's bodies and realizes Christy is likely to be alive. She ambushes Christy and almost kills her but is stopped by the old couple Jennifer encountered. Christy kills Becky by hitting her over the head with a glass beer bottle.

The old couple shows Christy where Jennifer's body is, saying, "It's right next to your father's grave." When they arrive at the cemetery, it is revealed that Johnny was Christy's father, and that Christy knew all along. She speaks to her mother and says she loves her and although Jennifer did not tell her who her father was, she knew the entire time. Christy is pushed into the grave by the old couple and the old woman Jennifer encountered previously. It is revealed that the old couple are Johnny's parents, and the old woman is Matthew's grandmother. They throw dirt on and continuously hit Christy until she passes out.

While the couple recites prayers, Christy manages to climb out of the hole. She hits and impales the old woman with a shovel and beats, slices, and stabs Johnny's mother to death with it and a shotgun. She threatens Johnny's father and makes him put Jennifer's body into his truck. She decides not to kill him, but instead, he shoots himself, committing suicide.

Christy goes to the church where her mother died as a way to announce her revenge was necessary. The film ends with Becky and Johnny's children, Melissa and Johnny Jr., coming to the gas station and wondering where their mother is, only to see Christy in their grandparents' car passing by.

== Cast ==
- Camille Keaton as Jennifer Hills
- Jamie Bernadette as Christy Hills
- Maria Olsen as Becky Stillman
- Jim Tavaré as Herman Duncan
- Jonathan Peacy as Kevin Woods
- Jeremy Ferdman as Scotty Chirensky
- Holgie Forrester as Millie Stillman, Old Woman
- Roy Allen III as Henry Stillman, Old Man
- Alexandra Kenworthy as Beady Eyes Duncan, Woman on Tricycle
- Tammy Scher as Melissa Stillman – Becky's Daughter
- Terry Zarchi as Johnny Stillman Jr. – Becky's Son
- Meir Zarchi as Priest (uncredited)

== Production ==
Meir Zarchi had written the script prior to the 2010 remake, but halted from production due to the subsequent sequels. Camille Keaton reprised her role from the previous film, as well as Terry Zarchi and Tammy Scher as older versions of Johnny's children.

Filming began on September 21, 2015 in Santa Clarita, California and wrapped on November 2, 2015. The film was in post-production for a little over three years before being released.

== Release ==
The first trailer was released in March which was followed by a second trailer in April. The film did not have a theatrical release, instead it was released DVD/Blu-ray premiere on April 23, 2019, and on VOD in over 60 countries on April 28, 2019.

On the day of the release, the Blu-ray edition entered the top 100 films on Amazon.com as well as no. 1 in the horror category.

The film was released on DVD and Blu-Ray on October 5, 2020 in the United Kingdom.

== Reception ==
I Spit on Your Grave: Deja Vu was met with generally negative reviews from critics. The film was criticized for its plot, pacing, acting and running time, though Keaton's and Bernadette's performances were praised.
