= Meir Zarchi =

Israeli film director

- מאיר זרחי
- Occupation: Film director
- Spouse: Camille Keaton (m. 1979; div. 1982)
- Children: 2

Meir Zarchi (Hebrew: מאיר זרחי) is an Israeli-American film director, screenwriter and producer.

== Career ==
Zarchi's first professional film credit came from providing the story for the 1962 Israeli drama, Nini.

Zarchi's first film as director was I Spit on Your Grave a.k.a. Day of the Woman (1978), which starred Camille Keaton, whom he married the following year. Grave, the story of a woman seeking violent revenge on the men who raped her, was considered controversial at the time of its release and suffered censorship in various countries.

Zarchi's sophomore effort came seven years later with the revenge-drama set in New York City, Don't Mess with My Sister (a.k.a. “Family and Honor”) (1985), which was nominated by the American Film Institute, The Hollywood Reporter and Billboard Magazine, as Best Fiction Feature Length Film on video. He acted as the Executive Producer for the movie Holy Hollywood (1999), a comedy-drama about wannabe actors, starring Mickey Rooney. Holy Hollywood was written and directed by Meir's son, Terry Zarchi. In 2013, Meir Zarchi published his latest novel-screenplay, Death Wish Soozan.

Over three decades following his first film, Zarchi became involved in the revival of the I Spit on Your Grave film series. He executive-produced the 2010 remake of the original, as well as its subsequent sequels: I Spit on Your Grave 2 (2013) and I Spit on Your Grave III: Vengeance Is Mine (2015). Zarchi then wrote and directed an official sequel to the original 1978 film, I Spit on Your Grave: Deja Vu, which was released in 2019 with Keaton reprising her role as Jennifer Hills. Zarchi's son, Terry Zarchi, directed the documentary, Growing Up With I Spit On Your Grave, also released in 2019, which offered a behind the scenes look at Meir's first film and Terry's own experience .

== Filmography ==
Year	Film	Director	Writer	Producer	Editor	Notes
1960	Rachel		Yes			
1962	Nini		Story			
1978	I Spit on Your Grave	Yes	Yes	Yes	Yes	
1987	Don't Mess with My Sister!	Yes	Yes	Yes	Yes	
2004	Holy Hollywood			Yes		
2010	I Spit on Your Grave			Executive		Also associate producer
2013	I Spit on Your Grave 2			Executive		
2015	I Spit on Your Grave III: Vengeance Is Mine			Executive		
2019	I Spit on Your Grave: Deja Vu	Yes	Yes	Yes		Also casting and cameo appearance
