= Armed (film) =

- Film poster
- Directed by: Mario Van Peebles
- Written by: Mario Van Peebles
- Produced by: Edward Beckford; Dwjuan F. Fox; Tony Hua; Justin Nesbitt; Kimberly Ogletree; Mandela Van Peebles; Maya Van Peebles
- Starring: Mario Van Peebles; Ryan Guzman; Columbus Short; Jemma Dallender; Brad Carter; Shakira Barrera; Laz Alonso; Dionne Warwick; Melvin Van Peebles; Roland Martin; Rocsi Diaz; Van Jones; Paul Rodriguez; William Fichtner
- Cinematography: Anthony J. Rickert-Epstein
- Edited by: Stephen J. Murray
- Music by: Larry Groupé; Steven W. Thomas
- Production company: MVP Films
- Distributed by: GVN Releasing
- Release date: September 14, 2018
- Running time: 118 minutes
- Country: United States
- Language: English

Armed is a 2018 action film written and directed by Mario Van Peebles. It stars Van Peebles and William Fichtner.

== Premise ==
Chief, a U.S. Marshal, is traumatized after leading undercover agents in a raid gone wrong. Chief is convinced that he was exposed to chemicals during the raid which are affecting his mind. When he begins receiving visits from his old team member Jonesie, he fears that Jonesie's anger and instability will bring harm to those around him.

== Cast ==
- Mario Van Peebles as Chief
- William Fichtner as Richard
- Ryan Guzman as Jonesie
- Columbus Short as Turell
- Dionne Warwick as Shirley
- Laz Alonso as Jessie
- Charles Halford as Meth
- Eugene Cordero as Himself
- Lane Garrison as Merc
- Jemma Dallender as Grace
- Brad Carter as Shep/Stew
- Paul Rodriguez as Hector
- D.C. Young Fly as G Money
- Melvin Van Peebles as Grandpa V
- Alena Savostikova as Nadia
- Kiami Nichols as Cat
- Sam Littlefield as Max
- Christopher Michael as Anchor
- Folake Olowofoyeku as Frida
- Justin Nesbitt as Actor
- Shakira Barrera as KC
- Rocsi Diaz as Maria
- Earthquake as Two Samiches
- Cheryl Dent as News Anchor
- Anna Talakkottur as Kashi
- Joe Rudy Guerrero Jr. as Body Guard
- Cameron MacKenzie as Stacey Bastion
- Desiigner as Himself
- Van Jones as Himself
- Mandy Newton as Stacy Double
- David Kenneth Sommerville as Wedding Guest
- Mark Oby Brown as Party Goer
- Roland Martin as Melvin
- Dennis Nicomede as Wedding Guest
- Ryan P. Shrime
- Geoffrey Ross as U.S. Marshal
- Tony Hua as Journalist

== Production ==
The working title of the film was If.

== Release ==
The film was released on September 14, 2018. Domestic distribution was handled by GVN Releasing and foreign distribution was handled by Hannibal Pictures.
