= Ogre (2008 film) =

2008 Canadian TV film

- Written by: Chuck Reeves
- Directed by: Steven R. Monroe
- Starring: John Schneider; Ryan Kennedy; Katharine Isabelle
- Music by: Pinar Toprak
- Countries of origin: Canada; United States
- Original language: English

Production
- Executive producers: Kirk Shaw; Lisa M. Hansen
- Producer: Lindsay MacAdam
- Cinematography: Thomas (Tom) Harting
- Editor: Asim Nuraney
- Running time: 90 minutes
- Production companies: CineTel Films; Insight Film Studios; Ogre Productions
- Budget: C$2 million

Original release
- Network: Syfy
- Release: March 8, 2008

Ogre is a 2008 American-Canadian television horror film directed by Steven R. Monroe for the Syfy Channel. In the story, teenagers stumble upon the fictional Ellensford, Pennsylvania a nearly forgotten town, stuck in a time loop in the mid 19th century. For the town to prevent a horrible plague from occurring, a human needs to be sacrificed every year to a vicious beast known as the Ogre.

== Cast ==
- John Schneider as Henry Bartlett, one of the leaders of the village.
- Ryan Kennedy as Mike, one of the teens that go to the village.
- Katharine Isabelle as Jessica, one of the teens that go to the village.
- Brendan Fletcher as Stephen Chandler, a villager.
- Chelan Simmons as Hope Bartlett, daughter of Henry and Stephen's friend.
