= Axeman (film) =

- DVD released by Midnight Releasing
- Directed by: Joston Theney; Agung Bagus; Jaime Morphy
- Written by: Joston Theney; Christopher Otiko; Agung Bagus; Jaime Morphy
- Screenplay by: Joston Theney
- Story by: Agung Bagus; Dylan Hobbs
- Produced by: Joston Theney
- Starring: Elissa Dowling; Tiffany Shepis; Brinke Stevens; Scot Pollard; Jamie Bernadette; Stephen Eith; Dylan Hobbs; Eliza Kiss; Suzi Hale; Paula Tracey
- Narrated by: Nihilist Gelo; Scot Pollard
- Cinematography: Tim McCombe
- Edited by: Joston Theney
- Music by: Joston Theney
- Production company: Blood Red Films
- Distributed by: Midnight Releasing
- Release dates: February 14, 2013 (Los Angeles, California)
- Running time: 105 minutes
- Country: United States
- Language: English

Axeman (originally released as Axeman at Cutter's Creek) is a 2013 American slasher film written and directed by Joston Theney. It had a limited theatrical release on February 14, 2013, and was released to DVD on May 6, 2014. The film follows an axe-wielding killer who terrorizes a group of friends at a secluded cabin.

== Plot ==
In a cabin by Cutter's Creek, bank robbers Denise, Vale, and Paulie are murdered by an axe-wielding serial killer known as the Axeman. Later, a group of friends led by Brian arrive at a nearby cabin. After settling in, Brian mentions that the reason he got the cabin for such a low price is because it supposedly once belonged to a family that was massacred by the Axeman. When the discussion concludes, Randy goes off to spy on Vivian, and is murdered by the Axeman, who rips his head off.

The next morning, Doug gets into an argument with his girlfriend, Cassidy, accusing her of still having feelings for her ex, Brian, who is now dating Cassidy's best friend, Stacy. Doug storms off into the woods, where he stumbles onto the money that the bank robbers stole. While looking for somewhere to hide the cash, Doug is impaled and dismembered by the Axeman, his death going unnoticed by his friends, who are searching for Randy. Everyone soon regroups at the cabin, and Cassidy, unsatisfied with every explanation that they can come up with for why Randy, and now Doug, are gone, leaves to continue searching for them alone.

Tammy enters the garage, where she uncovers the robbers' money, and is forced to hide when the Axeman enters with her girlfriend, Liz, whom he has seriously wounded. Before he can finish Liz off, the Axeman is distracted by a knock on the door, and answers it to reveal it is Sheriff Charlene Wopuzer. Annoyed by the sheriff's abrasive attitude and persistent questioning, the Axeman twists her head around, and returns to the garage, just as Tammy exits it with Liz. Liz dies from her injuries and Tammy is strangled by the Axeman, who also bites off and eats her cheeks.

Returning to the cabin, the Axeman rips Brian's brain out, knifes Vivian in the eye, beats Darren to death, and chases Stacy after finding her in a closet. He nearly strangles her to death, before she bites his nose. She stabs him in the leg after tripping over Cassidy's body before running into the woods, leaving her fate unknown.

== Cast ==
- Tiffany Shepis as Denise
- Brinke Stevens as Sheriff Charlene Wopuzer
- Elissa Dowling as Stacy
- Arielle Brachfeld as Deputy Darlene Whitfield
- Scot Pollard as Bill "The Axeman"
- Chantelle Albers as Cassidy
- Stephen Eith as Brian Corbin
- Dylan Hobbs as Doug
- Jamie Bernadette as Tammy
- Erin Marie Hogan as Liz
- Eliza Kiss as Vivian
- Nihilist Gelo as Randy
- Joston Theney as Darren
- Carlos Javier Castillo as Vale
- Ray Trickitt as Paulie
- Suzi Hale as Maureen
- Paula Tracy Wilson as Adele

== Reception ==
Bloody Disgusting panned the film overall, criticizing the script for not delving into the reasons that the titular Axeman was killing people, as this would give the film more depth and differentiate it from multiple similarly plotted films. Theron Moore of Horror News praised the film's villain and kills, but criticized the glacial pace, uninteresting subplots, stiff acting, and two-dimensional dialogue and writing. Ain't It Cool News gave a mostly favorable review for Axeman, commenting that while the movie was not "reinventing the slasher genre" it "does feel like a throwback to a time when the slashers weren't so passé."

== Sequel ==
A sequel entitled Axeman 2: Overkill, also written and directed by Joston Theney, was announced in 2014 and released straight-to-DVD and online retailers on October 17, 2017. Only Theney and Arielle Brachfeld reprise their roles from the original, with Bryan Clark replacing Scot Pollard as the titular character, in addition to Kailena Mai replacing Jamie Bernadette as Tammy, Whitney Nielsen replacing Erin Marie Hogan as Liz, and Maria Olsen replacing Paula Tracy Wilson as Adele. The film also stars Farrah Abraham, Rachel Reilly, Angelica Bridges, and Peter Stickles, and features a second axeman portrayed by Michael Wayne Foster.
