= Jeff Branson =

American actor

- Born: Jeffrey Dale Branson; March 10, 1977 (age 49); St. Louis, Missouri
- Occupation: Actor
- Years active: 2000–present
- Website: www.jeffbranson.com

Jeffrey Dale Branson (born March 10, 1977) is an American actor. He is known for his role as Ronan Malloy on The Young and the Restless, Jonathan Lavery on All My Children, and Shayne Lewis on Guiding Light.

== Career ==
Branson originated the role of Jonathan Lavery on the ABC soap opera All My Children on June 15, 2004. Although he was off the air from mid-April until August 2005 while his character was believed dead in an explosion, Branson remained on contract the entire time. Branson's last appearance on All My Children aired on December 18, 2007.

Branson's work prior to All My Children included a 2000 guest spot on NBC's Law & Order: Special Victims Unit. He had a small part that year in the film Shaft and in 2002 he was in the feature film Wolves of Wall Street.

In 2004, he played the role of a younger Alan Spaulding on Guiding Light; he also played Shayne Lewis on Guiding Light up until the last episode of the show on September 18, 2009.

In 2005, Branson received a Daytime Emmy Award nomination in the category of Outstanding Supporting Actor in a Drama Series for his work on All My Children as Jonathan Lavery. In 2009, he received his second Daytime Emmy Award nomination for his portrayal of Shayne Lewis on Guiding Light. He won this award, tied with Vincent Irizarry from All My Children.

In June 2010, Branson began work on The Young and the Restless in the role of Ronan Malloy. Malloy is Nina Webster's long-lost son that was stolen as a baby and put up for adoption. He plays an undercover FBI agent on a mission to bust corrupt cops in Genoa City involved in a drug ring. He left the show from February to August 2011. On June 26, 2012, he arrived back in Genoa City because of Victor Newman. In 2012, Branson won the Dankies Award for outstanding supporting actor for his role as Malloy.

Branson played the character of "Johnny" in the 2010 film I Spit on Your Grave, a remake of the 1978 revenge film.

His television appearances outside of daytime drama include episodes of NCIS, NCIS: Los Angeles, The Mentalist, Law & Order: Special Victims Unit, and Supernatural. He also appeared in the first season of Supergirl as Master Jailer.

Branson appears as Neil Armstrong in the Apple TV+ series For All Mankind.

== Filmography ==
=== Film ===
Year	Title	Role	Notes
2000	Shaft	Walter's friend	
2001	Semmelweis	Schmelling	Short film
2002	Get the Hell Out of Heaven	Stix	Short film
2002	Wolves of Wall Street	Tyler	
2005	Four Lane Highway	Andy	
2005	Building Girl	Mark	
2006	The Big Bad Swim	Noah Owens	
2006	Delirious	TV soap star	
2008	Swing Vote: What Side Are You On?	Jack	Short film
2009	The Magnificent Cooly-T	Johnny	
2010	I Spit on Your Grave	Johnny Stillman	
2011	History	Hank Martinez	Short film
2012	Delete	Fisher	Short film
2012	Trophy Husband	Trophy husband	Short film
2012	MoniKa	Terry Jo	
2014	Zoe Gone	Walter	
2015	Visions	Glenn Barry	
2016	Beyond Doubt	Mr. Fields	

=== Television ===
Year	Title	Role	Notes
2000	Strangers with Candy		Episode: "The Blank Page"
2000	Law & Order: Special Victims Unit	Chris Lyons	Episode: "Honor"
2004	Guiding Light	Young Alan Spaulding	Flashbacks
2004–2007	All My Children	Jonathan Lavery	163 episodes
2008	Without a Trace	Mark	Episode: "22 x 42"
2008–2009	Guiding Light	Shayne Lewis	Series regular (116 episodes)
2010–2012	The Young and the Restless	Ronan Malloy	Series regular (159 episodes)
2011	CSI: Miami	Dennis Baldwin	Episode: "Blood Lust"
2013	CSI: NY	Andy Stein	Episode: "Command+P"
2013	Chosen	Chris	2 episodes
2013	CSI: Crime Scene Investigation	Mr Davari	Episode: "In Vino Veritas"
2013	NCIS: Los Angeles	Agent Jenkins	Episode: "Big Brother"
2014	NCIS	Commander Chad Hendricks	Episode: "Shooter"
2014	Perception	Scott Kemp	Episode: "Inconceivable"
2014	The Mentalist	Walker Pond	Episode: "Black Market"
2015	Supernatural	Jacob Styne	Episode: "Book of the Damned"
2015	Party Monsters	Dorian Gray	TV film
2016	Supergirl	Carl Draper / Master Jailer	Episode: "Truth, Justice and the American Way"
2016	Forever 31	Greg	Miniseries; Episode: "Psycho"
2016	Christmas in Homestead	Vince Hawkins	TV film
2017	Grimm	Paul Maler	Episode: "El Cuegle"
2017	Major Crimes	Alan Redmond	4 episodes
2017	Ten Days in the Valley	Dominic	4 episodes
2019	For All Mankind	Neil Armstrong	2 episodes
