= Sergio Ferrero =

Italian novelist

- Born: 21 December 1926; Turin, Italy
- Died: 12 August 2008 (aged 81); Lezzeno, Italy

Sergio Ferrero (21 December 1926 – 12 August 2008) was an Italian novelist.

Born in Turin, Ferrero made his literary debut at 40 years old, with the novel Gloria. In 1971, he was a finalist at the Strega Prize with the novel Il giuoco sul ponte. After a 16-year hiatus, he reprised his literary activities in 1987.

In 1996, Ferrero won the Bagutta Prize for the novel Gli occhi del padre.

During his life, Ferrero collaborated as an editor with various newspapers and journals, and also worked as an antiquarian. He died on 12 August 2008 in Lezzeno, where he was spending his holidays.
