= Jeremy Ferdman =

Canadian actor (born 1986)

- Born: November 10, 1986 (age 38); Toronto, Ontario, Canada
- Occupation: actor

Jeremy Ferdman (born November 10, 1986) is a Canadian actor.

== Biography ==
First seen in the Toronto production of "Flora, the Red Menace", Jeremy Ferdman started his acting career on stage. He has performed in theatres across North America including Theatre Calgary, the John F. Kennedy Centre and The Winter Garden Theatre. After living in Atlanta where he worked at Georgia Shakespeare Festival touring with: A Midsummer Night's Dream, 'Will's World' (about the life of the famous playwright), and 'Metamorphoses', he moved to Los Angeles.

He has worked on a numerous television series including NBC's Angela's Eyes, the FXX series "Man Seeking Woman", Lifetime's Killer Kids, ABC's "Home for the Holidays", CW's "Burden of Truth" and Syfy's Warehouse 13.

Ferdman played the zany Poster Guy in Horrorween directed by Joe Estevez and acted alongside William Shatner. He can be seen in Dominion, a Dylan Thomas biopic starring Rhys Ifans, Tony Hale and John Malkovitch, for which he was also the executive producer. In 2016, Jeremy played the role of Marty Glickman in Race, a Jesse Owens biopic starring Stephan James, Jeremy Irons, Jason Sudeikis and William Hurt. In 2017, he starred in the critically acclaimed Robbery, which earned him a nomination for Outstanding Performance at the 2019 ACTRA Awards in Toronto.

Ferdman is a graduate of the Stella Adler Studio of Acting in New York City.

== Filmography ==
=== Film ===
Year	Title	Role	Notes
2011	Horrorween	Poster Guy	Direct-to-video film
2011	Gene's Revolution	Gene	Short film
2013	Dirty Talk	Chase	Short film
2013	3739 Miles Away	Joshua	Short film
2013	Donna Bachler's A Homecoming	Matt	Short film
2014	The Arrangement	Bobby	Short film
2015	Just One More Bite	Greg	Short film
2015	There Is Many Like Us	Katzenburg	Feature film
2016	Race	Marty Glickman	Biopic feature film
2016	Dominion (aka Last Call)	Michael	Biopic (also executive producer)
2018	Robbery	Richie	Feature film
2019	I Spit on Your Grave: Deja Vu	Scotty Chirensky	Film
2019	Always and Forever Christmas	Wade	TV movie
2019	Balloons	Guy	Short film
2020	Welcome to Sudden Death	Dillon	Direct-to-video film
2021	Hero Dog: The Journey Home	Van Driver	Feature film
2022	Adult Adoption	Mark	Feature film
2022	Firestarter	Eyes Man	Feature film

=== Television ===
Year	Title	Role	Notes
2006	Angela's Eyes	Young Frank Mitchum	TV series, 1 episode
2010	Rookie Blue	Josh	TV series, 1 episode
2014	Warehouse 13	Bryce – Frat Brother	Syfy TV series, 1 episode
2014	Killer Kids	Chris Snyder	Lifetime TV series, 1 episode
2014	Forks & Lives	Dan	Miniseries
2015	Man Seeking Woman	Zach	FXX series, 1 episode
2015	Canadian Reflections		TV series, 1 episode
2016	Unusual Suspects	Stewie Arden	TV series, 1 episode
2017	The Beaverton	Peppy Male	TV series, 1 episode
2019	Carter	Pa / A.D.	TV series, 2 episodes
2020	Burden of Truth	Rylan Carter	CW TV series, 1 episode
2020	Good Witch	Bellhop	TV series, 1 episode
	Home for the Holidays		ABC TV series
