= Nini (1962 film) =

Israeli film by Shlomo Suryano

Nini is an Israeli romantic drama film from 1962, directed by Shlomo Suryano and starring Arik Einstein and Ronit Katz in the lead roles.

The screenplay was written by Shlomo Suryano and is based on the 1957 book Nini, Daughter of the Other Religion by Meir Zarhi. The Israeli Film and Theater Censorship Board initially sought to ban the film because of its story about a Jewish man falling in love with a Christian woman. Ultimately, the screening of the film was approved, but it was denied the benefits usually granted to Israeli films under the Israeli Film Law.

== Background ==
This was Arik Einstein's first film. He portrays a young Jewish man who falls in love with a young Christian woman despite opposition from all sides. Ronit Katz, a former member of the Nahal entertainment troupe, was chosen by Suryano from among the students of the Beit Zvi acting school for her role.

Production was "harassed by Israeli authorities".

The film premiered at the "David Palace" cinema, received harsh reviews, failed commercially, and was largely forgotten.

The film is described as follows: "Banned by the sensors, officially for its risqué imagery – its lack of Zionist messaging may have been too much for the authorities in 1962." The film, in which the Arabic language is dominant, although one of the first film produced in the country, was deemed "an exotic non-Israeli affair".

== Production ==
The film is Meir Zarchi's first film credit (as author of the original story). It was filmed against the backdrop of the streets and scenery of Tel Aviv-Jaffa in the 1960s.

== Home video ==
United King Films later released a DVD box set of Arik Einstein's films, including a digitally restored edition of Nini.

== Screenings ==
The film was screened in Boca Raton in 2023 as part of series of Israeli films.

== Reception ==
The film was noted as an example of the increasing number of productions with female leads in Israeli cinema of the time.
