= Madeleine: Anatomy of a Nightmare =

- Theatrical release poster
- Italian: Madeleine, anatomia di un incubo
- Directed by: Roberto Mauri
- Screenplay by: Roberto Mauri
- Produced by: Nello Paolantoni
- Starring: Camille Keaton; Riccardo Salvino; Pier Maria Rossi
- Cinematography: Carlo Carlini
- Edited by: Adriano Tagliavia
- Music by: Maurizio Vandelli
- Release date: 25 May 1974
- Running time: 100 minutes
- Country: Italy
- Language: Italian

Madeleine: Anatomy of a Nightmare (Italian: Madeleine, anatomia di un incubo) is a 1974 Italian psychological horror film written and directed by Roberto Mauri, and starring Camille Keaton, Riccardo Salvino, and Pier Maria Rossi. It follows the psychological unraveling of a young woman after suffering a traumatic miscarriage.

== Plot ==
Madeleine, a young American woman, is spending the summer at a vacation home outside Rome with her French husband, Dr. Franz Shuman. Madeleine, whose biggest wish is to bear a child, has recently suffered a traumatic miscarriage, and is plagued by a bizarre recurring dreams pertaining to the death of her unborn child. In the dream, Madeleine is chased through the woods by numerous versions of herself bearing colorful hair; they pursue her until they stumble upon the scene of a wrecked car with a burned body next to it, and the women proceed to throw a child's casket containing a babydoll onto the flames.

While in the city, Madeleine meets Thomas, a young, attractive university student whom she offers a ride. Madeleine returns home with Thomas and awkwardly introduces him to Franz. She later explains to Thomas Franz has a penchant for studying psychology and the occult in his spare time. Madeleine and Thomas have sex in the house, as Franz, unbeknownst to them, spies from another room. Franz subsequently informs Thomas that Madeleine is prone to schizophrenic episodes. Later, Madeleine and Thomas go on a boating excursion, during which Madeleine confesses that she is sometimes "overtaken" by a presence. She also divulges her bizarre dream to Thomas, but he dismisses it as an irrelevant nightmare.

Later, Madeleine meets Luis, a fellow American and musician with whom she also begins a romantic dalliance. Thomas later tells Madeleine he cannot see her anymore, as he has a girlfriend. Madeleine responds to this news with little upset, and invites Thomas to attend a large party Franz is holding to celebrate the arrival of his son, Luis, from the United States. During the party, Thomas's girlfriend Mary gets drunk, and Madeleine attempts to seduce her, but is stopped by Franz. Franz begins to attempt to have sex with Mary, which causes an outburst when Thomas bears witness to this. After the two men get into a fight, Thomas wanders outside and drowns himself in the swimming pool.

After Thomas's suicide, Madeleine leaves Franz and meets with Luis, to whom she professes her love. As the two kiss on the beach, Franz arrives, interrupting the lovers' rendezvous. Franz humiliates Madeleine by revealing all of her affairs to Luis, who then rejects her. Franz proceeds to brandish a gun, apparently shooting Madeleine. However, this is proved to be a mere ruse—later, Luis, Thomas, and Franz observe Madeleine in a hospital: It is revealed that Luis is in fact Madeleine's husband, while Franz and Thomas are psychiatrists who have been studying her as a test case in an attempt to understand her shattered psyche; Mary is a nurse who works with the psychiatrists. Madeleine awakens, and appears to finally have a state of mental clarity, suggesting that their elaborate, clandestine therapy plot was successful. However, when Luis departs with Madeleine, she demands to be reunited with Franz, whom she now believes to be her husband.

== Cast ==
- Camille Keaton as Madeleine
- Riccardo Salvino as Luis
- Pier Maria Rossi as Thomas
- Paola Senatore as Mary
- Silvano Tranquilli as Dr. Franz Shuman
- Gualtiero Rispoli as Antonio

== Sources ==
- Flowers, John; Frizler, Paul (2004). Psychotherapists on Film, 1899-1999: M-Z. Jefferson, North Carolina: McFarland. ISBN 978-0-786-41908-1.
