= Mary Stockley =

British actress

Mary Stockley is a British stage, television and film actress.

A former member of the National Youth Music Theatre, Stockley studied drama at university. She made her first television appearance in 2001 in the TV film Being Dom Joly, in 2002, going on to play Kate Matherson in thirty episodes of Family Affairs on Five. Stockley played Josie Turner in The Body in the Library- Agatha Christie's Marple (2004), Gina Way in Jericho (2005), Edie Covington in The Inspector Lynley Mysteries (2006), Mrs. Clay in Persuasion (2007), Tess in Britz (2007), Miss Jay in Ballet Shoes (2007), and Eve Carpenter in Mrs. McGinty's Dead- Agatha Christie's Poirot (2008).

Her film appearances include Ruth Ellis in Pierrepoint (2005), Ruth in V for Vendetta (2006), Kate in Artifacts (2007), Michelle in 7 Lives (2011), Mrs. Fisher in The Woman in Black (2012), Ana in I Spit on Your Grave 2 (2013), and Assistant in Diana (2013). She also voices characters in Star Wars: The Old Republic.

Stockley's theatre credits include Oliver!; Merrily We Roll Along (2000) at the Donmar Warehouse; Hope Harcourt in the musical Anything Goes (2002) and Katherine in Love's Labour's Lost (2003), both the latter at the Royal National Theatre. In 2008, she played Marigold in The Common Pursuit at the Menier Chocolate Factory. She played Judy in the National Theatre's production of The Curious Incident of the Dog in the Night-Time.

== Filmography ==
=== Films ===
Film
Year	Title	Role	Notes
2002	Not 360		(Short)
2005	V for Vendetta	Ruth	
2005	Pierrepoint	Ruth Ellis	
2007	Artifacts	Kate	
2011	7 Lives	Michelle	
2012	The Woman in Black	Mrs. Fisher	
2013	Diana	Diana Assistant 2	
2013	I Spit on Your Grave 2	Ana Patov	
2018	Caught	Cass	(Short)

=== TV ===
Television
Year	Title	Role	Notes
2001	Being Dom Joly		(TV Movie)
2002	Family Affairs	Kate Matherson	(TV Series), 6 episodes
2004	Agatha Christie's Marple	Josie Turner	(TV Series), 1 episode: "Episode #1.4"
2005	Jericho	Gina Way	(TV Series), 1 episode: "The Killing of Johnny Swan"
2006	Bodies	Susannah Marshall	(TV Series), 1 episode: "The Finale"
2006	The Inspector Lynley Mysteries	Edie Covington	(TV Series), 1 episode: "Natural Causes"
2007	Ballet Shoes	Miss Jay	(TV Movie)
2007	Britz	Tess	(2 part TV Movie)
2008	Poirot	Eve Carpenter	(TV Series), 1 episode: "Mrs McGinty's Dead"
2008	Masterpiece Classic	Mrs. Clay	(TV Series), 1 episode: "Persuasion"
2014	Penny Dreadful	Caroline Frankenstein	(TV Series), 1 episode: "Resurrection"
2017	Inspector George Gently	Patricia Willis	(TV Series), 1 episode: "Gently Liberated"
2018	The Alienist	Mrs. Tinker	(TV Series), 1 episode: "A Fruitful Partnership"
2018	Delicious	Allie Brooks	(TV Series), 1 episode: "Episode #1.4"
2019	Endeavour	Hildegard Slayton	(TV Series), 1 episode: "Apollo"
2021	Bettys Diagnose		(German TV Series), 1 episode: "Der nächste Schritt"

=== Video games ===
List of voice performances in video games
Year	Title	Role	Notes
2011	Star Wars: The Old Republic	Watcher Two and Additional Voices	
2014	Star Wars: The Old Republic - Shadow of Revan	Shara Jenn / Imperial Medic / Lieutenant Sabri	
2017	Divinity: Original Sin II	Various	
2017	Mass Effect: Andromeda	Additional Voices	
2019	Star Wars: The Old Republic - Onslaught	Additional Voices	
