= Jamie Bernadette =

American actress

- Born: Jamie Bernadette Watkins; December 14, 1979 (age 46); Kankakee, Illinois, U.S.
- Occupations: Actress, producer
- Years active: 2007–present

Jamie Bernadette Watkins (born December 14, 1979) is an American actress, noted for being a scream queen for appearing prominently in horror films.

== Early life ==
Watkins was born and raised in Kankakee, Illinois. She is the youngest of nine children, five sisters and four brothers. Her father died four months after her birth, leaving her mother to raise all of the children on her own with very limited means. Watkins dreamed of being on the big screen since she was around five years old. She watched movies repeatedly and acted out the scenes, mimicking the actresses she loved. Watkins began acting in Community Theater productions at about age 10 and did some theater in high school as well. She studied acting at Margie Haber Studios and the Van Mar Academy of Motion Picture and Television Acting.

== Career ==
Watkins came to a crossroads in her life when she had the choice to stay in her hometown, or venture out to Los Angeles to pursue a career in acting. She came to the decision to try out Hollywood and left with $600 in her pocket and drove across the country by herself.

Her first roles include the thriller Son of Sam and the short Struck (both 2008), co-starring Kelly Preston and Jenna Elfman. In 2009, she had a bigger role besides David Carradine in Absolute Evil. Since 2010, she was seen in more popular movies such as MILF (2010), Axeman (2013), What Now (2015), starring Ice-T, Mortdecai (2015), starring Johnny Depp, Jem and the Holograms (2015), and The Darkness (2016), starring Kevin Bacon. She also appeared in an episode of The Neighbors.

In 2016, she starred in Let's Be Evil and All Girls Weekend. She also played the starring role in I Spit on Your Grave: Deja Vu (2019).

== Filmography ==
=== Film ===
Year	Title	Role	Notes
2008	Struck	Heather	Short
2008	Son of Sam	Sara Greenwood	Video
2009	Absolute Evil	Maggie	
2009	Nightstalker	Laurie	Video
2010	Mortal Kombat: Rebirth	Jill	Short
2010	MILF	Alex	Video
2010	The Porcelain Grave	Veronica Damon	Short
2010	Mirk Riders	Chloe	Short
2011	365 Days	Catherine Fisher	Video
2011	Justice on the Border	Major Lori Stevens	
2012	Celebrity Sex Tape	Hot Goth Chick	
2012	Operation Terror	Stewardess	
2012	Reel Evil	Claire	
2012	Steampunk Samurai Biker Chick	Boss Reeby	
2012	Manhaters!	Shelby	
2012	Resident Evil: Resurrection	Rebecca Chambers	Short
2013	Axeman	Tammy	
2014	The Secret Children	Sophia	
2014	The Bunnyman Massacre	Kelly	
2014	The Knockout Game	Newscaster	Short
2014	See Me	Wife	Short
2015	Mortdecai	Bikini Babe	
2015	What Now	Becca the Goth Girl	
2015	Scarf	Alex	
2015	L.A. Slasher	The Detective	
2015	Jem and the Holograms	Reporter	
2016	Let's Be Evil	Body of Arial	
2016	The Demon in the Dark	Scandal	Short
2016	Hot Bot	Schoolgirl Bot	
2016	The Darkness	Restaurant Patron	
2016	13 Days	Christine	
2016	All Girls Weekend	Nancy	
2016	Injustice for All	Catwoman	Short
2016	Face of Evil	Katy	
2016	The 6th Friend	Joey Taylor	
2016	Sinbad and the War of the Furies	Jax	
2016	Elder Island	Stacy Ryerson	
2017	A Place in the Caribbean	Sarah	
2017	American Satan	Juliette	
2018	Killing Joan	Joan Butler	
2018	4/20 Massacre	Jess	
2018	Every 21 Seconds	Prosecutor Leslie Clarkson	
2018	The Wrong Teacher	Ashley Hayes	TV movie
2019	Smothered by Mothers	Lola	
2019	I Spit on Your Grave: Deja Vu	Christy Hills	
2019	The Furnace	Mary Harris	
2019	Darling Nikki	Greta	
2020	Reality Queen!	Woman in Black	
2020	The Bone Box	Deputy Ella Kade	
2020	Dead by Dawn	Snack	
2020	Axeman: Redux	Tammy	
2021	The Wrong Fiancé	Bree	TV movie
2021	The Wrong Prince Charming	Mia	TV movie
2022	The Wrong Blind Date	Mrs. Tyler	TV movie
2022	The Wrong Guy	Diana	Short
2022	The Wrong High School Sweetheart	Amy	TV movie
2022	Nicole, Her Ex & the Killer	Debra	
2022	Jurassic Domination	Colonel Ramirez	
2022	Ash and Bone	Anna Lambeth	
2023	Homestead	Beth	
2023	Home, Not Alone	Kendall Jones	TV movie
2023	Colonials	Zoey	
2023	Cop vs. Killer	Jessica Abrams	
2023	End Times	Claire Davis	
2023	Lonesome Soldier	Doctor Chambers	
2023	A Christmas Intern	Gemma	TV movie
2024	The Wrong Life Coach	Natalie	TV movie
2024	Tall, Dark, and Dangerous	Alice	TV movie
2024	Texas Twister	Rita Martin	
2024	Million Dollar Lethal Listing	Samantha	TV movie
2024	Cold Blows the Wind	Briar	
2024	Axes and Os	Abby	
2025	A Deadly Ride	Kailey	
2025	Maybelline Prince	Delyle	
2025	The Wrong Marriage	Vicki	TV movie
2025	Sebastian	Irene Ludwick	
2025	She Rides Shotgun	Mom at School	
2025	The Haunted Forest	Susie	
2025	Deinfluencer: Clickbait	Sasha	
2025	The Last Tenant	Stacey Cooper	
2025	A Christmas Murder Mystery	Jan	TV movie
2026	The Wrong Baby Daddy	Julia	TV movie
	Paranormal Investigations	Kelsey	

=== Television ===
Year	Title	Role	Notes
2007	Tell Me You Love Me	Dancer	Episode: "Episode #1.3"
2011	1000 Ways to Die	Mental Patient Tracy	Episode: "Ready or Not Here Comes Death"
2011	N.Y.P.D.M.	Madison	Episode: "Sorores"
2012	Broken Toy	Mary	Episode: "Good Guy?"
2013–14	Deadly Wives	Melanie McGuire	Episode: "Body of Water" & "Vanishing Acts"
2014	The Neighbors	Stewardess	Episode: "Uncle Benjamin"
2014–15	Coyote Munch Mini-Mart	Additional Voices (voice)	Recurring Cast
2017	NCIS: New Orleans	Callie Tillford	Episode: "The Asset"
2018	Midnight, Texas	Peaches	Episode: "Resting Witch Face"
2022	The Legend of Firelily	Shay	Episode: "Daddy's Girl"
2022	Keeping Up with the Joneses	Emma	Recurring Cast
2022	Chicago Fire	Ms. Katz	Episode: "A Beautiful Life"
2023	As Luck Would Have It	Jamie	Episode: "Old Flames, New Fires"

=== Music video ===
Year	Artist	Song	Role
2010	Chali 2na	"Step Yo Game Up"	Detective

== Awards ==
- Recipient of the 2017 Best Actress Award by the Independent Cinema Foundation and Festival Academy (ICFFA)
- Best Actress in a feature film for The 6th Friend at the 2016 Freak Show Horror Film Festival
- Best Actress in a feature film for The 6th Friend at the 2016 RIP Horror Film Festival,
- Nominated Best Original Screenplay of a feature film for The 6th Friend at the 2017 Madrid International Film Festival
- Best Feature Film for The 6th Friend at the 2016 Freak Show Horror Film Festival
- Best Horror Feature Film for The 6th Friend at the 2017 Independent Filmmakers Showcase IFS Film Festival
- Best Ensemble for feature film Smothered by Mothers at the 2017 New York Film Awards
