= I Spit on Your Grave =

1978 film by Meir Zarchi

- Theatrical release poster
- Directed by: Meir Zarchi
- Written by: Meir Zarchi
- Produced by: Joseph Zbeda
- Starring: Camille Keaton; Eron Tabor; Richard Pace; Anthony Nichols
- Cinematography: Yuri Haviv
- Edited by: Meir Zarchi
- Production company: Cinemagic Pictures
- Distributed by: The Jerry Gross Organization
- Release date: November 22, 1978
- Running time: 102 minutes
- Country: United States
- Language: English
- Budget: $80,000

I Spit on Your Grave (originally titled Day of the Woman) is a 1978 American rape and revenge film written, directed, and edited by Meir Zarchi. The film tells the story of Jennifer Hills (Camille Keaton), a fiction writer based in New York City who exacts revenge on her four tormentors who gang rape and leave her for dead.

I Spit on Your Grave is noted for its controversial depiction of extreme graphic violence, particularly the lengthy depictions of gang rape, that take up 30 minutes of its runtime. During its wider release, it was branded a "video nasty" in the United Kingdom, and was a target of censorship by film commissioning bodies. Film critic Roger Ebert became one of the most notable detractors of I Spit on Your Grave, calling it "a vile bag of garbage".

The film remains highly controversial to this day, even being considered to be one of the worst films ever made. For some, it is this controversy which has led to it being deemed a cult classic. Despite the controversy and overwhelmingly negative reviews, the performance of Keaton was praised by critics. In 2010, I Spit on Your Grave was included in Time magazine's "Top 10 Ridiculously Violent Movies".

The film spawned a 2010 remake, which has since spawned two sequels of its own: I Spit on Your Grave 2 (2013), and I Spit on Your Grave III: Vengeance Is Mine (2015). A direct sequel, I Spit on Your Grave: Deja Vu, was released in 2019 with Zarchi and Keaton both returning.

In her memoir Inside Out, Demi Moore confirmed that she is the scantily clad woman on the film's poster with her back turned.

== Plot ==
Short story writer Jennifer Hills lives in Manhattan and rents an isolated cottage in Kent near the Housatonic River in the Litchfield County countryside to write her first novel. The arrival of the attractive and independent young woman attracts the attention of Johnny Stillman, the gas station manager, and Stanley Woods and Andy Chirensky, two unemployed men. Jennifer has her groceries delivered by Matthew Duncan, who is mildly mentally disabled. Matthew is friends with the other three men and reports back to them about the beautiful woman he met, claiming that he saw her breasts.

Stanley and Andy start cruising by the cottage in their boat and prowling around the house at night. One day, the two men attack Jennifer while she is on her boat. They drag her to shore, and Johnny joins them. Jennifer realizes that they planned her abduction so Matthew could lose his virginity. She fights back, but the three men rip her bikini off and hold her. Matthew is reluctant to rape Jennifer, so Johnny and Andy rape her instead. After she crawls back to her house, they attack her again. Matthew finally rapes her after drinking alcohol, but does not ejaculate because the others are watching. The other men ridicule her book and rip up the manuscript, and Stanley violently sexually assaults her. She passes out; the men start to leave, but Johnny realizes that she is a witness to their crimes and orders Matthew to kill her. Matthew, remorseful over his actions, cannot bring himself to stab the still-unconscious Jennifer, so he dabs the knife in her blood and then returns to the other men, claiming that he has killed her.

In the following days up to two weeks since the four sexual assaults, a traumatized Jennifer pieces both herself and her manuscript back together. She goes to church and asks for forgiveness for what she plans to do. The men learn that Jennifer has survived, and they beat Matthew up for deceiving them. Jennifer calls in a grocery order, knowing that Matthew will deliver it. He takes the groceries and a knife. At the cabin, Jennifer entices him to have sex with her under a tree. She then hangs him and drops his body into the lake.

At the gas station, Jennifer seductively directs Johnny to enter her car. She stops halfway to her house, points a gun at him, and orders him to remove all his clothing. Johnny insists that the rapes were all her fault because she enticed the men by parading around in revealing clothing. She pretends to believe this and invites him back to her cottage for a hot bath, where she gives him a handjob. When Johnny mentions that Matthew has been reported missing, Jennifer states that she killed him, which he takes as a joke; as he nears orgasm, she takes the knife Matthew brought with him and severs Johnny's genitals. She leaves the bathroom, locks the door, and listens to opera music as Johnny screams, bleeding to death. After he dies, she dumps his body in the basement and burns his clothes in the fireplace.

Stanley and Andy learn that Johnny is missing and take their boat to Jennifer's cabin. Andy goes ashore with an axe. Jennifer swims out to the boat and pushes Stanley overboard. Andy tries to attack her, but she escapes with the axe. Andy swims out to rescue Stanley, but Jennifer plunges the axe into Andy's back, killing him. Stanley moves towards the boat and grabs hold of the motor to climb aboard, begging Jennifer not to kill him. She repeats the order he made to her during the sexual assaults, "Suck it, bitch!", then starts the motor, disemboweling him with the propeller as she speeds away.

== Cast ==
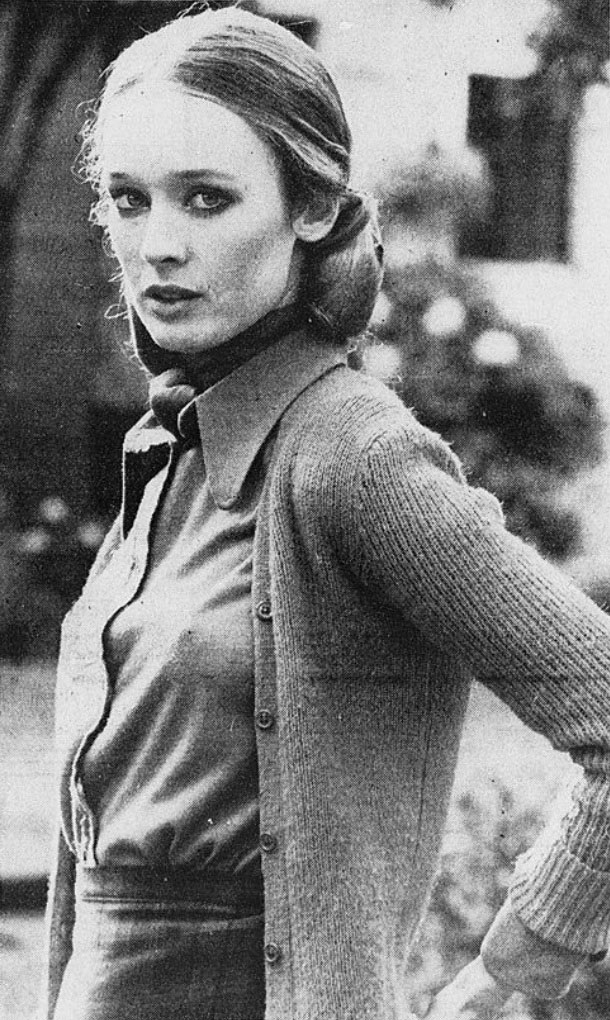
Camille Keaton starred in the film as Jennifer Hills. Director Meir Zarchi called her "brave" for accepting this role. Camille Keaton married Meir Zarchi.

- Camille Keaton as Jennifer Hills
- Eron Tabor as Johnny Stillman
- Richard Pace as Matthew Duncan
- Anthony Nichols as Stanley Woods
- Gunter Kleemann as Andy Chirensky
- Alexis Magnotti as Becky Stillman, Johnny's Wife
- Tammy Zarchi as Melissa Stillman, Johnny's Daughter
- Terry Zarchi as Johnny Stillman Jr., Johnny's Son
- Traci Ferrante as Waitress
- William Tasgal as Porter
- Isaac Agami as Butcher
- Ronit Haviv as Supermarket Girl

== Production ==
=== Writing ===
The inspiration for I Spit on Your Grave came from an encounter writer-director Meir Zarchi had in 1974 with a young woman who was raped and beaten by two men at a park in New York City. The idea did not begin to fully develop until Yuri Haviv, the film's cinematographer, invited Zarchi to spend the weekend at a summer house he had rented in Kent, Connecticut which contains an extension of the Housatonic River nearby. Zarchi eventually chose to shoot in these locations because they provided a tranquil atmosphere for the film's antiheroine, Jennifer Hills. He spent four months writing the screenplay, the bulk of which was written at his usual subway route to his office in Times Square and back home where his wife would then typewrite the handwritten pages in the evening. The typewriter his wife had used is seen in the film as the same one Jennifer uses to complete her manuscript.

=== Casting ===
To cast the stars, Zarchi put up a casting call advertisement in Backstage magazine that sought one woman and four men in their 20s to star in a low-budget production. Camille Keaton is said to have been one of over 4,000 actresses who auditioned for the role of Jennifer. Zarchi set up an interview for Keaton and found her to be an "experienced actress" as well as "beautiful and photogenic". After a series of auditions to test Keaton's suitability for the role, Zarchi was convinced that she could play it effectively.

== Release ==
Zarchi was unable to find a distributor, so he distributed the film himself. Day of the Woman played a number of engagements in rural drive-in theaters, but only for brief runs each time, and Zarchi barely made back the money he had spent on advertising. In 1980, it was picked up for distribution by the Jerry Gross Organization. A condition of this re-release was that the distributors could change the title to anything they wished. It was at this time the film was retitled I Spit on Your Grave. The movie did not have a theatrical release in the United Kingdom and was solely released on home video in that country.

=== Controversy ===
The film caused significant controversy and backlash for its graphic violence, particularly the rape scene, with feminists protesting the movie and people accusing the movie of glorifying rape. The Motion Picture Association of America tried to prevent the film's producers from using the R rating. After the association gave I Spit on Your Grave an R rating, the producer of the film added rape scenes, making it an X-rated movie. Ultimately an agreement was reached where the film removed any references or explicit shots referring to anal rape and the MPAA restored the original R rating. In an interview with Fangoria, director Meir Zarchi said as a response to the backlash:

Frankly, I'm not concerned whether it receives bad press or not. It doesn't touch me one way or the other whatsoever. If you told me that the public does not like it and the critics like it, then there is something very, very bad about that. Who am I reaching? Three-hundred critics around the United States, or 2,000 around the world? It's really the public that counts, the 20 million who have seen the film around the globe.

==== Censorship efforts ====
Many countries, including Ireland, Norway, Iceland and West Germany, banned the film altogether, claiming that it "glorified violence against women". Canada initially banned the film, but in the 1990s decided to allow its individual provinces to decide whether to permit its release. Since 1998, some provinces (such as Manitoba, Nova Scotia, and Quebec) have released the film, with a rating that reflects its content.

The censored American version of the film was released in Australia in 1982 with an R18+ rating. In 1987, the film survived an appeal to ban it. It continued to be sold until 1997, when another reclassification caused its ban in Australia. In 2004, the full uncut version was awarded an R18+, lifting the seven-year ban. The Office of Film and Literature Classification justified this decision by reasoning that castration is not sexual violence (Australian censorship law forbids the release of films that depict scenes of sexual violence as acceptable or justified).

In the United Kingdom, the film was refused a cinema certificate by the British censors. However, since films on video did not need censor's certificates at the time, it was released on home video, where it was branded a "video nasty" by the press. It appeared on the Director of Public Prosecutions' list of prosecutable films until 2001 when a heavily cut version that extensively edited the rape scenes was released with an 18 certificate. The cuts were reduced considerably from 7 minutes 2 seconds in the 2001 release to 2 minutes 54 seconds in the 2011 release so that only the scenes of rape that focus on Jennifer's nudity have been banned since the 2011 release.

In New Zealand, the uncut version of the film (102 minutes) was classified in 1984 as R20 with the descriptive note, "Contains graphic violence, content may disturb". Other versions with shorter running times (96 minutes) were also classified in 1984 and 1985 and received the same classification.

=== Home media ===
Elite Entertainment released I Spit on Your Grave on LaserDisc on December 8, 1998. Elite later issued a DVD as part of their Millennium Edition collection on December 17, 2002.

The film received its first Blu-ray release on September 20, 2010, in the United Kingdom from 101 Films. It was released in an 'Ultimate Collector's Edition', containing the film on both Blu-ray and DVD, a collector's booklet, and a poster. At the time it was the most complete version released in the UK, but it was not uncut - cuts of almost three minutes were required for an '18' rating to the rape scenes (previous UK releases were cut by over seven minutes). It was also released alongside the remake in a 'Limited Collector's Edition' on February 7, 2011, in the UK. It was again submitted for UK DVD in 2020, and was passed with lesser cuts, this time totaling 1 min. 41 secs. It was released on February 8, 2011, in the United States from Starz/Anchor Bay Entertainment.

Ronin Flix released a three-disc collector's edition Blu-ray box set in 2020. The film was released again by Ronin Flix on 4K UHD on October 26, 2021 in a three-disc set, followed by a single-disc version on November 23, 2021.

== Reception ==
=== Commercial performance ===
The film did poorly at the box office but managed to have some success in videocassette sales. I Spit on Your Grave reached number 24 on Billboard's 1981 list of best-selling titles. The film stayed in the Billboard Video Cassette Top Forty for 14 consecutive weeks and won the number one best-selling video cassette award above more popular movies like Fiddler on the Roof, The Godfather Part II and Grease. By 1982, I Spit on Your Grave had been released on video six times in the United States due to high demand. In a 1984 interview with Fangoria, Zarchi said, "I found out that of the millions of video machines in England, there's maybe one single house that has not seen I Spit on Your Grave." He claimed that by that point 20 million people worldwide had seen I Spit on Your Grave.

=== Critical response ===
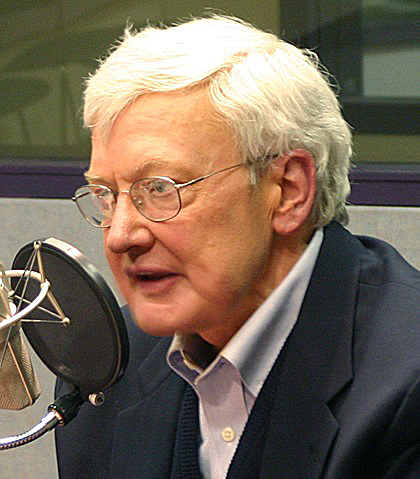
Roger Ebert heavily panned I Spit on Your Grave upon release and went on to consider it the worst movie ever made.

I Spit on Your Grave received several negative reviews from critics. Roger Ebert gave the film zero stars, referring to it as "A vile bag of garbage ... without a shred of artistic distinction", adding, "Attending it was one of the most depressing experiences of my life" and considered it the worst movie ever made. Gene Siskel also considered it one of the worst films ever made. Critic Luke Y. Thompson of The New Times stated that "defenders of the film have argued that it is actually pro-woman, due to the fact that the female lead wins in the end, which is sort of like saying that cockfights are pro-rooster because there is always one left standing". A contributor to Encyclopedia of Horror notes that the film attracted much debate for and against, frequently involving people who clearly had not actually seen the film. "The men are so grossly unattractive and the rapes so harrowing, long-drawn-out and starkly presented, it is hard to imagine most male spectators identifying with the perpetrators, especially as the film's narrative structure and mise-en-scene force the spectator to view the action from Keaton's point of view. Further, there is no suggestion that she 'asked for it' or enjoyed it, except, of course, in the rapists' own perceptions, from which the film is careful to distance itself." The author continues that the scenes of revenge were "grotesquely misread by some critics", as Jennifer only "pretends to have enjoyed the rape so as to lure the men to their destruction", and that in these scenes, the film is critiquing "familiar male arguments about women 'bringing it on themselves'" as "simply sexist, self-excusing rhetoric and are quite clearly presented as such".

=== Later reception ===
The initial criticism was followed by reappraisals of the film. Michael Kaminski's 2007 article for the website Obsessed with Film, titled "Is I Spit on Your Grave Really A Misunderstood Feminist Film?" argues that, when understood within the context in which director Zarchi was inspired to make it, the movie may be equally appropriate to analyze as "feminist wish-fulfillment" and a vehicle of personal expression reacting to violence against women.

A reappraisal was made by Carol J. Clover in the third chapter of her 1992 book Men, Women, and Chainsaws. Clover notes that she and others like her "appreciate, however grudgingly, the way in which [the movie's] brutal simplicity exposes a mainspring of popular culture." Clover further argues that the film's sympathies are entirely with Jennifer, that the male audience is meant to identify with her and not with the attackers, and that the point of the film is a masochistic identification with pain used to justify the bloody catharsis of revenge. Clover wrote that, in her opinion, the film owes a debt to Deliverance. The British feminist Julie Bindel, who claimed to have been involved in pickets outside cinemas in Leeds when the film was released, has said that she was wrong about the film and that it is a feminist film.

On review aggregator Rotten Tomatoes, I Spit on Your Grave holds an approval rating of 51%, based on 39 reviews, and an average rating of 5.4/10. Its consensus reads, "I Spit on Your Grave is as aggressively exploitative as its title suggests, although as a crude rejoinder to misogyny, it packs a certain amount of undeniable power."

== Sequels and remake ==
The film was followed by an unofficial sequel, Savage Vengeance (the title card on the film was misspelled as Savage Vengance) (1993) in which Camille Keaton (under the alias of Vickie Kehl for unknown reasons) reprises the role of Jennifer.

CineTel Films acquired rights with the remake also titled I Spit on Your Grave, which had a Halloween 2010 worldwide theatrical release. The remake was produced by CineTel president and CEO Paul Hertzberg and Lisa Hansen, with Jeff Klein, Alan Ostroff, Gary Needle and Zarchi as executive producers. Steven R. Monroe directed, with newcomer Sarah Butler starring as Jennifer. The follow-up I Spit on Your Grave 2 was released on September 20, 2013, starring Jemma Dallender, Joe Absolom, Yavor Baharov, and Aleksandar Alekiov. It was directed by Steven R. Monroe and written by Thomas Fenton and Neil Elman. A second sequel, I Spit on Your Grave III: Vengeance Is Mine, arrived in 2015, with Butler reprising her role as Jennifer.

The official sequel I Spit on Your Grave: Deja Vu, directed by original director Meir Zarchi, was finished in October 2016 with Camille Keaton reprising her role as Jennifer Hills.

== See also ==
- Revenge
- List of 20th century films considered the worst
- List of cult films

== Sources ==
- Cleary, Sarah (2022). The Myth of Harm: Horror, Censorship and the Child. New York City, New York: Bloomsbury. ISBN 978-1-501-37829-4.
