= Jennifer Hills =

- I Spit on Your Grave character
- Camille Keaton as Jennifer Hills in the 1978 film
- Created by: Meir Zarchi

Original timeline
- Portrayed by: Camille Keaton (1978; 2019)
- Occupation: Writer
- Children: Christy Hills (daughter)
- Status: Deceased

Remake timeline
- Portrayed by: Sarah Butler (2010–2015)
- Occupation: Writer; Crisis Counselor
- Alias: Angela Jitrenka
- Status: Alive

Jennifer Hills is a fictional character in the I Spit on Your Grave horror film series, portrayed by Camille Keaton in the original film and by Sarah Butler in the remake films. She appears in four out of the five I Spit on Your Grave films. She is a vigilante in the 1978 original, its 2019 sequel Deja Vu, the 2010 remake, and the sequel to the 2010 film, I Spit on Your Grave III: Vengeance Is Mine. In the films, she seeks vengeance against her rapists and other sexual predators.

== Appearances ==
=== Original timeline ===
In the 1978 film, Jennifer is an aspiring short story writer from New York vacationing in a cabin in the woods to focus on writing her novel. She is then assaulted by a group of local rednecks, Johnny Stillman, Matthew Duncan, Andy Chirensky, and Stanley Woods who rape her, destroy her manuscript and leave her for dead. She then becomes a vigilante, hunting down her tormentors, and killing them one by one.

In 2019, Camille Keaton reprised her role as Jennifer in I Spit on Your Grave: Deja Vu, the sequel to the original film and timeline. Decades after the events of the original film, Jennifer published a successful autobiography that recounts the assaults against her and her revenge; this infuriates the family members of the men that she killed, Becky Stillman (Johnny's wife), Beady Eyes Duncan (Matthew's grandmother), Herman Duncan (Matthew's father), Henry Stillman (Johnny's father), Millie Stillman (Johnny's mother), Scotty Chirensky (Andy's cousin), and Kevin Woods (Stanley's brother) and causes them to seek retribution of their own. They slit her throat and decapitate her, but her daughter Christy then meets revenge with revenge. It is also revealed that, despite Jennifer's effort of concealing Christy's father's identity from her, Christy knew that he was one of her mother's rapists due to the time of conception, and secretly identified that Johnny, a gas station manager and leader of the rapist group, was her biological father.

=== Remake timeline ===
The remake incarnation of Jennifer remains the same as the original incarnation on account of her being a writer from New York City renting a cabin to write her book and becoming a vigilante after being raped by local men. However, the remake Jennifer instead writes a second novel and after her ordeal, lives in an abandoned house scavenging for food and secretly spying on her rapists to learn more about their lives and plan ideas to take them down one by one. The way she murders her tormentors is more macabre than that of the original.

In the sequel, she assumed the pseudonym "Angela Jitrenka" and works as a hotline operator wherein she also continues being a vigilante who murders sex offenders in a brutal fashion after having been driven insane by her past ordeals and her paranoia over men.

== Development ==
=== Casting ===
In an interview, Zarchi stated that "I put ads in two industry magazines, weekly magazines in New York, in the spring of 1976. It said this would be a low-budget movie to be shot this summer, looking for characters and we described the characters and their approximate age, four men and one woman. We got thousands and thousands of stills and resumes, from all over the country. One of them was of Camille Keaton. I remember auditioning a few thousand men and maybe 600 women and as soon as I saw Camille's still, her black-and-white still, I felt there was something there. I called her in, we auditioned her for a few weeks and played her against selected men. Eventually, it narrowed down to Camille and the four guys."

== Reception ==
In Men, Women, and Chain Saws: Gender in the Modern Horror Film, Carol J. Clover stated that "Jennifer takes the revenge she does not for deep-seated psychological reasons but because it is the punishment that fits the crime; there are no extenuating circumstances; the law is not involved, nor are legal questions raised; and there is no concern whatever, not even at the level of lip service, with moral and ethical issues." Luke Bonanno of DVDizzy.com praised Camille Keaton's performance saying "As the thin, long-haired aspiring novelist turned retributory badass, Ms. Keaton is unquestionably the best thing about I Spit and her performance stands out by more than just an easy process of elimination." Michael Jacobson said "I think Camille Keaton gives an astoundingly powerful performance in this movie. Some might condemn her for her career short-sightedness in making such a picture, but I prefer to praise her for her courage. A lot is asked of her, and a lot rides on her ability to sell some really horrid sequences." Roger Ebert criticized the film and the character saying that "If I rape you, I have committed a crime. If you kill me, you have committed another one. The ideal outcome would be two people unharmed in the first place. The necessity of revenge is embedded in the darker places of our minds, and most hate speech is driven by 'wrongs' invented in unbalanced minds. No one who commits a hate crime ever thinks his victim is innocent."
