= Thomas Fenton =

American screenwriter

- Screenwriter Thomas Fenton at Fantastic Fest 2026

Thomas Fenton is an American screenwriter, producer and director.

Fenton grew up in Rochester, New York. His 5th grade had a movie-making class, where he's made some student sci-fi, horror and martial arts films. He attended Hofstra University and took film classes there on Long Island. Fenton started as a grip and best boy in New York City. Fenton opened and operated a production company doing commercial and music video production in New York.

Fenton later moved to Hollywood switching to screenwriter and also working as a graphic novelist. Fenton's first break in Hollywood was doing a rewrite on Belly of the Beast by Stephen Seagal. Fenton wrote Dominion a graphic novel about the Angelic War and the first human drafted into the battle for eternity. Fenton worked with Twisted Pictures on a number of films includingSaw IV, which was nominated for a 2008 Scream Awards for Best Sequel, losing to The Dark Knight.Fenton then wrote scripts for CineTel Films, including I Spit On Your Grave 2.

Fenton also wrote Jericho Hill, a horror short adapted from his script and produced through a partnership between Eli Roth's Crypt TV and Michael Bay's 451 Media Group. Fenton spent years working with late producer Robert Evans at Paramount Pictures, including on DeLorean, the story of maverick car maker John DeLorean. In addition, Fenton does what many believe is one of the best impressions of Evans.

In an interview with Daily Dead, he discussed his early experiences making films and his approach to writing in the horror genre.

In 2018, Fenton wrote The Scream Writer's Handbook that is considered one of the better books on screenwriting. While continuing to write and direct, Fenton founded Workingscreenwriter.com his online teaching portal.

In 2023, Fenton wrote the screenplay for What Happened to Doris?, which was developed with producer Steven Schneider. he film had its world premiere at Fantastic Fest in September 2026, followed by its international premiere at the Sitges Film Festival in October 2026.

Gizmodo reported that Heather Graham was attached to star in Entity Within.[7]

In 2024, Fenton was interviewed for the documentary Generation Terror, which features filmmakers including Rob Zombie, Adam Wingard, and Neil Marshall. In the documentary, Fenton comments on his contribution to the early 2000s “torture porn” movement, stating that he does not use the term and instead prefers “karma porn.”

== Filmography ==
- Lady in White (1988) (Video Playback Operator)
- Cheap Shots (1989) (Grip)
- Slaughter of the Innocents (1993) (Grip)
- Night Trap (1993) (Cast/Key Grip)
- Double Dragon (1994) (Grip)
- Striking Point (1995) (Director/Writer/Editor)
- Halloween 4: Final Cut (2001) (Additional Photographer)
- Seraph (2002) (Writer)
- Belly of the Beast (2004) (Draft)
- Max Payne (2005) (Draft)
- Saw IV (2007) (Story)
- Zombies Vs Robots (2007) (Treatment)
- Terminated (2009) (Writer)
- DeLorean (2010) (Writer)
- Chain Letter (2010) (Draft)
- Dominion (graphic novel) (2011) (Writer)
- Dominion (Fist of God) (2011) (Writer)
- Dominion (Resurrection of Ash ) (2011) (Writer)
- City At Midnight (2012) (Writer)
- I Spit on Your Grave 2 (2013) (Writer)
- Slay Per View (2016) (Writer)
- Generation Terror (2024) (Self)
- What Happened to Doris? (2026) (Writer)
