= Jemma Dallender =

British actress (born 1988)

- Born: 4 June 1988 (age 38); Portsmouth, England
- Occupation: Actress
- Years active: 2012–2020

Jemma Dallender (born 4 June 1988) is an English actress. She is known for her role in the film I Spit on Your Grave 2 (2013).

== Early life ==
Dallender is from Portsmouth, Hampshire. She earned a Musical Theatre degree from the Arts Educational School (ArtsEd) in West London. She has a daughter in 2020.

== Career ==
Dallender made her television debut in 2012 with a three-episode stint in the Channel 4 soap opera Hollyoaks. This was followed by her first lead role in the film I Spit on Your Grave 2 (2013).

Dallender continued to appear on television, in series such as Casualty (2014) and I Live with Models (2015), as well as a string of films—most notably, Contract to Kill (2016) and Armed (2018).

== Partial filmography ==
- Hollyoaks (TV series, 2012) – Katie, 3 episodes
- Community (Film, 2012) – Isabell
- I Spit on Your Grave 2 (Film, 2013) – Katie Carter ft Kural
- Taken: The Search for Sophie Parker (TV film, 2013) – Janie Hillman
- Casualty (TV series, 2014) – Caitlin Conlon, 1 episode
- The Mirror (Film, 2014) – Jemma
- I Live with Models (TV series, 2015) – Nancy, 1 episode
- Contract to Kill (Film, 2016) – Zara Hayek
- Pop Music High (Web series, 2017) – Farrah, 4 episodes
- Tails of the Blue (Web series, 2017) – Queen Manchester, 2 episodes
- The Executioners (Film, 2018) – Belle
- Armed (Film, 2018) – Grace
- Daddy's Girl (Film, 2018) – Zoe
- TactiCOOL Reloads (Short Film 2018)
- Disappearance (Film, 2019) – Cecile
- Strain 100 (Film, 2020) – Jesse
- Jemma Dallender ft Kural
