= Steven R. Monroe =

American movie director

- Born: September 15, 1964 (age 61); New York, U.S.
- Years active: 1986–present

Steven R. Monroe (born 1964) is an American film director and writer. His credits include the remake of the 1978 horror movie I Spit on Your Grave (2010) and its sequel I Spit on Your Grave 2 (2013). He resides in Los Angeles, California.

== Films ==
=== As director ===
- House of 9 (2005)
- It Waits (2005)
- Sasquatch Mountain (2006)
- Dual (2008)
- Ogre (2008)
- Storm Cell (2008)
- Wyvern (2009)
- Ice Twisters (2009)
- I Spit on Your Grave (2010)
- Mongolian Death Worm (2010)
- Jabberwock (2011)
- Complacent (2012)
- 12 Disasters of Christmas (2012)
- MoniKa (2012)
- End of the World (2013)
- I Spit on Your Grave 2 (2013)
- Grave Halloween (2013)
- Cyber Case (2015)
- The Exorcism of Molly Hartley (2015)
- Christmas Tree Lane (2020)
- Milliardaire ou presque (2021)
- Unborn (2022)

=== As writer ===
- Mongolian Death Worm (2010)
- MoniKa (2012)
