= I Spit on Your Grave (2010 film) =

2010 American horror film

- Theatrical release poster
- Directed by: Steven R. Monroe
- Screenplay by: Stuart Morse
- Produced by: Lisa M. Hansen; Paul Hertzberg
- Starring: Sarah Butler; Jeff Branson; Daniel Franzese; Rodney Eastman; Chad Lindberg; Tracey Walter; Andrew Howard
- Cinematography: Neil Lisk
- Edited by: Daniel Duncan
- Music by: Corey Allen Jackson
- Production company: CineTel Films
- Distributed by: Anchor Bay Entertainment
- Release dates: May 1, 2010 (Texas Frightmare Weekend); October 8, 2010 (United States)
- Running time: 108 minutes
- Country: United States
- Language: English
- Budget: $2 million
- Box office: $572,809

I Spit on Your Grave is a 2010 American rape and revenge film and a remake of the controversial 1978 cult film of the same name (originally titled Day of the Woman). It was directed by Steven R. Monroe and written by Stuart Morse, based on the original film's director/writer Meir Zarchi's screenplay, and stars Sarah Butler, Jeff Branson, Daniel Franzese, Rodney Eastman, Chad Lindberg, Tracey Walter, and Andrew Howard.

It was distributed by CineTel, and produced by the company's president and CEO Paul Hertzberg. Lisa Hansen, Jeff Klein, Alan Ostroff, Gary Needle, and Meir Zarchi (director of the original) served as executive producers. Principal photography began on November 2, 2009, with location filming taking place in Louisiana.

I Spit on Your Grave had its premiere on Texas Frightmare Weekend on May 1, 2010, and was theatrically released in the United States on October 8, 2010, by Anchor Bay. The film received negative reviews from critics and grossed $572,809 on a $2 million budget.

The film was followed by two sequels, I Spit on Your Grave 2 (2013) and I Spit on Your Grave III: Vengeance Is Mine (2015).

== Plot ==
Novelist Jennifer Hills travels from New York City to Louisiana to work on her next book in privacy. The gas station attendant, Johnny Miller, gives her directions to her rented cabin when she gets lost. He embarrasses himself by trying to flirt with her. When the cabin's plumbing becomes clogged, it is fixed by Matthew Duncan, a stuttering plumber with an intellectual disability. She rewards him with an abrupt kiss of gratitude. Matthew tells Johnny and his friends Andy Chirensky and Stanley Woods about what happened with Jennifer. Johnny, whose ego was bruised after the gas station incident, decides that Jennifer is "snobbish" and needs to be taught a lesson.

That night, the four men sneak into the cabin to taunt and assault her, although Matthew refuses to participate. She escapes into the woods and bumps into the local sheriff, Storch, and Earl, the owner of the cabin. Storch takes Jennifer back to the cabin, but when he finds her drugs and alcohol, he casts doubts on her story. After Johnny, Matthew, Andy, and Stanley return, all five men gang rape her, including an initially reluctant Matthew, who thus loses his virginity; Stanley records everything with his video camera. Afterward, just as Storch is about to shoot her dead, a naked and degraded Jennifer falls into the river to escape.

Jennifer begins to stalk her rapists in order to learn details of their lives. Stanley tells Andy and Johnny that his camera has been stolen, along with the videotape of their assault. Storch intercepts a videotape sent to his wife and confronts the men to find out who sent it. Johnny and Andy suspect Matthew. When they go hunting, Storch shoots and kills Earl, fearing that he may be a "loose end" if an investigation results from the disappearance of Jennifer, who has been missing for a month at this point. Earl had earlier told sheriff Storch that a "woman named Barbara" had been calling asking about Jennifer and that the sheriff may have been the last person to see her.

Matthew enters an abandoned cabin and encounters Jennifer, who, despite his apology, strangles him unconscious. She captures Stanley in a bear trap, ties him to a tree, smears fish guts on his face, and then leaves his camera to record crows pecking out his eyes, which she pinned open with fish hooks. She then drowns Andy and burns his face off in a lye bathtub. Next, she ties Johnny to the rafters of an abandoned house and uses pliers to pull out his teeth and a pair of pruning shears to emasculate him, leaving him to bleed to death. While torturing them, she repeats the taunts all of the men had used on her.

Jennifer visits Storch's wife, posing as their daughter Chastity's new teacher. She takes the daughter to the park and, when Storch tracks her there, she knocks him unconscious. When he wakes up, Jennifer stuffs his shotgun into his anus and reminds him that she was just as innocent as his own daughter. She attaches one end of a string to the trigger and the other end to the wrist of the still unconscious Matthew, who is seated in front of Storch, and leaves the premises. When Matthew wakes up, he sees the bound sheriff and tries to move, triggering the shotgun, which fires through Storch's anus and mouth before hitting Matthew in the chest, killing both men. Sitting outside on a branch, Jennifer hears the gunshot and smiles.

== Cast ==
- Sarah Butler as Jennifer Hills
- Jeff Branson as Johnny Miller
- Daniel Franzese as Stanley Woods
- Rodney Eastman as Andy Chirensky
- Chad Lindberg as Matthew Duncan
- Tracey Walter as Earl
- Andrew Howard as Sheriff Storch
- Mollie Milligan as Mrs. Storch
- Saxon Sharbino as Chastity Storch

== Production ==
Principal photography began on November 2, 2009, under Steven R. Monroe's direction. The film was distributed by CineTel, and produced by the company's president and CEO Paul Hertzberg. Lisa Hansen, Jeff Klein, Alan Ostroff, Gary Needle, and Meir Zarchi (director of the original) served as executive producers. Location filming took place in Louisiana. The film was written by Stuart Morse, based on Zarchi's screenplay.

== Release ==
CineTel Films handled the 2010 worldwide theatrical release. The film was part of the Texas Frightmare Weekend on May 1, 2010 in the Sheraton Grand Hotel in Irving, Texas, and part of the Film4 Frightfest on August 29, 2010. The Canadian unrated version premiered at the Fantasia International Film Festival on July 20, 2010. The complete cast and Meir Zarchi, director of the original, were present. An unrated version opened theatrically in limited theatrical release on October 8, 2010, in the United States. Coincidentally, another unrated horror film, Hatchet II, opened a week beforehand.

=== Home video ===
The film's video release in the United States, Canada, Australia and the UK is handled by Anchor Bay Entertainment. The DVD and Blu-ray were released in the United States on February 8, 2011. The DVD includes an audio commentary by director Steven R. Monroe and producer Lisa Hansen, as well as 11 deleted scenes, and teasers and trailers.

The DVD was banned in New Zealand just before its April release.

In Germany, the film was placed on the List of Media Harmful to Young People restricting the access to adults only.

== Critical reception ==
Critical reaction to the film has been generally negative, with a 31% rating on Rotten Tomatoes based on 62 reviews with the consensus simply labeling it as a "Well shot exploitation that has less purpose and utility than in 1978". On Metacritic the film was assigned a rating of 27, based on 14 critics, indicating "generally unfavorable" reviews.

Roger Ebert gave the film a zero star rating, as he did the original, and described it as the "despicable remake of the despicable 1978 film". He stated that it added "a phony sense of moral equivalency [...] If I rape you, I have committed a crime. If you kill me, you have committed another one. The ideal outcome would be two people unharmed in the first place." While he allowed that the movie was made "professionally", as opposed to the original version that was devoid of skill and artistry, he considered this largely in the service of the truly offensive material, the rape scenes. He summarized, "this [version] is more offensive, because it lingers lovingly and at greater length on realistic verbal, psychological and physical violence against the woman, and then reduces her 'revenge' to cartoonish horror-flick impossibilities."

Mick LaSalle of the San Francisco Chronicle wrote: "In addition to all the obvious things that are disgusting about this movie, I Spit on Your Grave is trying to get us to hate each other. Hate it instead. It makes more sense and the hatred is much more deserved." Critic Andrew O'Hehir also denounced the notion that the film has a message, writing that it "just piles imaginary atrocities on top of real ones, and then halfheartedly claims that it means something. Well, it doesn't."

Some support for the film in mainstream press came from The New York Times, whose reviewer wrote: "Female-empowerment fantasy or just plain prurience, Grave is extremely efficient grindhouse." V. A. Musetto, from the New York Post, also offered some support for the film, stating, "If you can handle it, see it."

Like the original, the film did find cult support. Fangoria magazine wrote that I Spit on Your Grave "is just as raw and upsetting in its onscreen brutality as the original. Perhaps more so, since the acting is significantly better this time around."

== Sequels ==
A sequel titled I Spit on Your Grave 2 directed by Steven R. Monroe, was produced, and had a limited theatrical release on September 20, 2013. The film does not feature Sarah Butler. The film's plot concerns a young aspiring model named Katie (Jemma Dallender) who accepts an offer to have photos taken for her modeling portfolio. The events turn into a nightmare of torture, rape, and kidnapping, with a revenge plot similar to the first film.

In March 2015, Anchor Bay Entertainment announced the third installment in the series, titled I Spit on Your Grave III: Vengeance Is Mine. Sarah Butler returned to her role as Jennifer Hills, and R.D. Braunstein directed the film.
