= Camille Keaton =

American actress

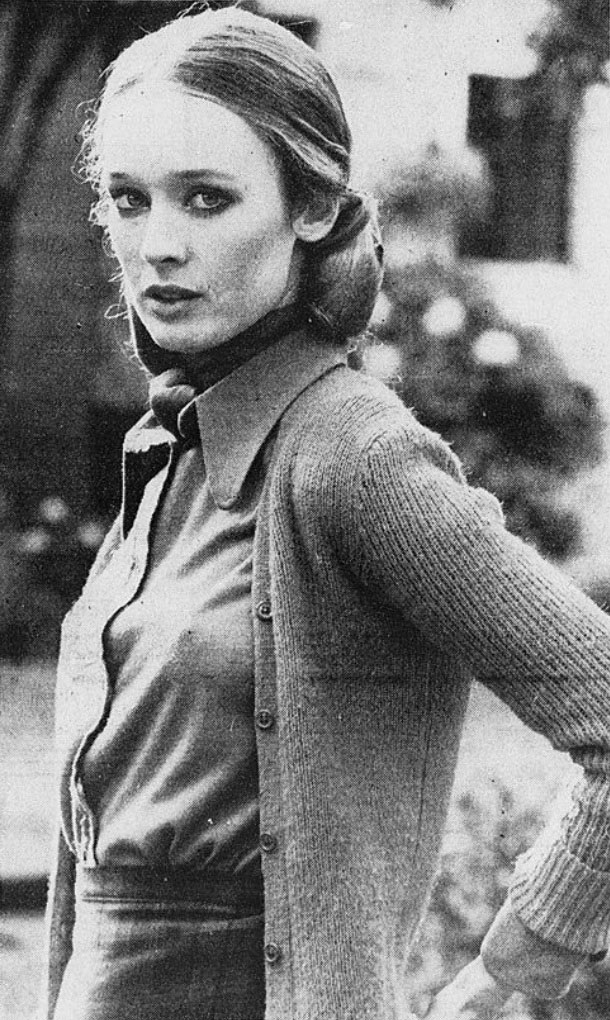
- Keaton c. 1972
- Born: July 20, 1947 (age 78); Pine Bluff, Arkansas, U.S.
- Other names: Vickie Kehl; Vickie Lahl
- Occupation: Actress
- Years active: 1972–present
- Spouses: Meir Zarchi (m. 1979; div. 1982) Sidney Luft (m. 1993; died 2005)
- Awards: Medalla Sitges en Plata de Ley (1978)

Camille Keaton (born July 20, 1947) is an American actress. She is best known for her role as Jennifer Hills in the controversial 1978 film I Spit on Your Grave. She began her career in Italy, making her film debut as Solange Beauregard in the giallo film What Have You Done to Solange? (1972), and starred in several other Italian horror films through the early 1970s. In 2015, Keaton reprised her role as Jennifer Hills for the film, I Spit on Your Grave: Deja Vu, which was released in 2019.

== Early life ==
Keaton was born July 20, 1947, (Note: Several sources state Keaton's birthdate as July 20, 1947, including a 2015 interview with an Italian publication. Keaton gives the date of July 20 on her Facebook page.) in Pine Bluff, Arkansas. She attended middle school in Eudora, Arkansas until 1960 when her family moved to Atlanta, Georgia.

In 1969, she was involved in a major car accident that left her with facial scarring. Keaton once worked as a hostess for Amtrak.

== Career ==
Keaton relocated to Italy in 1971, where she had signed with a talent agent, and appeared in several commercials. Her debut role was in 1972 playing the role of Solange, a missing teenage girl, in Massimo Dallamano's movie of the giallo genre entitled What Have You Done to Solange?. Though a small role, her delicate and fragile physique got immediate attention. Robert Marcucci says of her role as Solange, "She truly steals every scene she's in, simply drifting in and out of each of her scenes, her face and mannerisms mysterious and alluring." The same year, she appeared as the lead in the Italian horror film Tragic Ceremony (1972).

In November 1972, Keaton was a centerfold in the Italian men's entertainment magazine Playmen. In September 1974, she was on the cover of Playmen. Keaton returned to the United States in 1975, settling in New York City. She then appeared as Jennifer Hills, a rape victim who wreaks bloody vengeance on her attackers, in the controversial exploitation film I Spit On Your Grave (1978), directed by her future husband, Meir Zarchi. For her performance, she won the Medalla Sitges en Plata de Ley (Sitges Sterling Silver Medal) Best Actress award at the 1978 Sitges - Catalan International Film Festival.

After the release of I Spit On Your Grave, Keaton moved with husband Zarchi to Los Angeles, California.

In 2012, Keaton appeared in an uncredited role in Rob Zombie's The Lords of Salem, and has also appeared in the films Chop (2011) and The Butterfly Room (2013).

Her most recent films include Samuel Farmer's home-invasion thriller The Last House (2019), Terror in Woods Creek (2017), Blood River (2013) and Plan 9 (2015).

== Personal life ==
In 1979, Keaton married Israeli filmmaker Meir Zarchi, the director of I Spit on Your Grave; they divorced in 1982. She was married to film producer Sidney Luft from March 20, 1993, until his death on September 15, 2005.

== Filmography ==
Year	Title	Role	Notes
1972	What Have You Done to Solange?	Solange Beauregard	
1972	Decameron II - Boccaccio's other short stories	Alibech	Italian: Decameron No. 2 – Le altre novelle di Boccaccio
1972	Tragic Ceremony	Jane	
1973	The Brooklyn Cat Aspiring Detective II	Guendalina Bacherozza de Porcaris	Italian: Il gatto di Brooklyn aspirante detective II
1973	Sex of the Witch	Ann	Italian: Il sesso della strega
1974	Madeleine: Anatomy of a Nightmare	Madeleine	Italian: Madeleine, anatomia di un incubo
1978	I Spit on Your Grave	Jennifer Hills	
1982	Raw Force	Girl in toilet	
1982	The Concrete Jungle	Rita Newman	
1989	No Justice	Preacher's wife	
1993	Savage Vengeance	Jennifer	
2004	Holy Hollywood	Betty	
2010	Chop	Mrs. Reed	
2010	Turkish Saddle	Karmen Roback	Latin: Sella Turcica
2012	The Butterfly Room	Olga	
2012	The Lords of Salem	Doris Von Fux	Uncredited
2013	Blood River	Mirabella	
2015	Diabolical Cabaret	Agent Marcia Wilson	French: Cabaret Diabolique
2015	Plan 9	Grandma	
2017	Death House	Kristi Boon	
2017	Terror in Woods Creek	Principal Beasley	
2018	Me and Mrs. Jones	Mom	
2019	The Last House	Marsha Kane	aka Cry for the Bad Man
2019	I Spit on Your Grave: Deja Vu	Jennifer Hills	
2020	Camp Twilight	District Attorney	
2022	The People in the Trees	Mother	
2023	Christ Rising	Elizabeth	
2024	Coffintooth	Glynis	

== Sources ==
- Ettinger, Art (2006). "What have they done to Camille Keaton?". Ultra Violent (8): 35–50.
- Curti, Roberto (2017). Riccardo Freda: The Life and Works of a Born Filmmaker. McFarland. ISBN 978-1-476-66970-0.
- Koven, Mikel J. (2006). La Dolce Morte: Vernacular Cinema and the Italian Giallo Film. Scarecrow Press. ISBN 978-0-810-85870-1.
