= I Spit on Your Grave III: Vengeance Is Mine =

2015 American horror film

- Theatrical release poster
- Directed by: Richard Schenkman (as R.D. Braunstein)
- Written by: Daniel Gilboy
- Produced by: Lisa M. Hansen; Paul Hertzberg
- Starring: Sarah Butler; Jennifer Landon; Doug McKeon; Gabriel Hogan; Harley Jane Kozak; Michelle Hurd
- Cinematography: Richard J. Vialet
- Edited by: Ana Florit
- Music by: Edwin Wendler
- Production company: CineTel Films
- Distributed by: Anchor Bay Films
- Release date: October 23, 2015 (US)
- Running time: 91 minutes
- Country: United States
- Language: English
- Box office: $144,420

I Spit on Your Grave III: Vengeance Is Mine is a 2015 American rape and revenge film, directed by Richard Schenkman (credited as R.D. Braunstein) from a screenplay by Daniel Gilboy. It is the third film of the remake trilogy and the fourth overall installment in the series. The film stars Sarah Butler, Jennifer Landon, Doug McKeon and Harley Jane Kozak. Butler reprises her role as Jennifer Hills from the 2010 film I Spit on Your Grave (a remake of the 1978 original).

== Plot ==
The film follows the life of Jennifer Hills, continuing her story from I Spit on Your Grave. After Jennifer survived her assault and exacted revenge on the men who raped her, she avoided conviction for her killing spree and settled in Los Angeles. She's no longer an aspiring writer and now devotes her time to working as an assault helpline operator and going to group counseling under the assumed name "Angela Jitrenka". She's also periodically shown attending personal therapy for her ordeal. Jennifer's scarring experience has left her highly distrustful and defensive towards most men, including her colleague Matthew, who has a seemingly genuine interest in her.

While in group counseling, Jennifer develops a bond with one of the girls in the group, Marla, who also doesn't trust men. The duo begins their own personal crusade by exacting revenge for victims of sexual assault. However, just as Jennifer begins to enjoy life, Marla dies under mysterious circumstances, and no one is found guilty of her death. She becomes acquainted with Detective McDylan, an investigator into Marla's death who, however, brings neither justice for Marla nor closure for Jennifer. Distraught and enraged at how the law couldn't help Marla or the rape victims in her support group, she decides to get vengeance.

Jennifer stalks and lures the unpunished rapists to a private place to torture and kill them. Her first victim is Marla's estranged boyfriend and alleged murderer, soon followed by the stepfather of a teenage member of the group. After befriending Oscar, the only male member of the support group who lost his daughter to suicide after a sexual assault, Jennifer tracks down his daughter's rapist. The man manages to overpower her as she tries to attack him until he's shot dead by the police, whose attention Jennifer had been drawing through her actions. The police take Jennifer in for questioning, revealing their knowledge of her true identity in an attempt to obtain a confession. However, Oscar, who had grown sympathetic to Jennifer's cause, walks into the police station after slashing his own arms and publicly admits to the murders before dying from his wounds.

No longer the prime suspect, Jennifer is released but stays under police watch as a person of interest. She has a nervous breakdown, becoming further disillusioned with society and no longer able to discern well-meaning men from sexual predators. Clad in a suggestive red dress to bait men, Jennifer leaves her home, evading the police watch. First, she unsuccessfully attempts to seduce Matthew and scares him away; she then tries to lure a local thug who had been harassing her. As Jennifer is about to kill him, she's shot and arrested by McDylan, who had been trailing her the entire time.

It's now revealed that Jennifer's personal therapy sessions were part of her mandatory treatment following a two-year sentence for attempted murder, lacking evidence of the murders that she actually committed. After completing the final session before her release, Jennifer leaves the doctor's office and switches the "therapist" sign on the door to read "the rapist". She's then attacked by two inmates, whom she kills, before killing her therapist, who had left the room to stop it, but this is revealed to be a daydream, indicating that Jennifer's bloodlust against rapists isn't satiated.

== Cast ==
- Sarah Butler as Jennifer Hills / Angela Jitrenka
- Jennifer Landon as Marla Finch
- Doug McKeon as Oscar "Koza" Kosca
- Gabriel Hogan as Detective McDylan
- Harley Jane Kozak as Therapist
- Michelle Hurd as Detective Boyle
- Russell Pitts as Matthew
- Walter Perez as Chief
- Karen Strassman as Lynne
- Christopher Hoffman as Ron
- Andrew Dits as Nicholas Woods
- Adam Dunnells as Cole Watson

== Box office ==
The film opened in Russia and Ukraine on October 1, 2015. Russia debuted the movie at the number 11 with a total of $44,021 from 81 screens. Ukraine fared better with a fifth place opening and a weekend total of $18,603 from 48 screens. After a three-week run in Russia and Ukraine, the cumulative totals were $111,089 and $33,331 respectively.
