= Rape and revenge =

Film subgenre

- Years active: 1970s–present
- Location: International; started in Sweden and United States
- Major figures: The Last House on the Left; I Spit on Your Grave; Irréversible; The Virgin Spring
- Influences: European art cinema, Exploitation film
- Influenced: Feminist film, New French Extremity, Vigilante film

Rape and revenge, or rape-revenge, is a horror film subgenre characterized by an individual enacting revenge for rape or other sexual acts committed against them or others. Rape and revenge films are also commonly thrillers or vigilante films.

Notable for its graphic depiction of violence, rape, torture, and sexual imagery, rape and revenge films have attracted critical attention and controversy, often gaining a cult following and retrospectively associated with the New French Extremity, underground cinema, and arthouse cinema.

== Themes and characteristics ==
"Rape and revenge" was the pioneer and, so far, most controversial film hybrid-genre of the mid-20th century that focuses on the main protagonist. It has pioneered and is considered controversial for the portrayal of female (main) characters who become anti-hero(s)/vigilante(s) that engage in a vicious plot to eliminate the perpetrator/rapist(s) who have harmed them. There is some debate as to whether or not the revenge must be carried out by the assault victim to be considered part of this genre, or if it may be carried out by their loved ones as well.

These early films rose in prominence in the 1970s and relied heavily on the shock value of brutal rape scenes, followed by the even larger shock of the main character's sadistic revenge.

== History ==
The genre stems from a fascination with revenge in western culture, beginning with the descriptive tragedies of the Greeks and continuing in Elizabethan England (by Thomas Kyd and William Shakespeare). This desire for revenge or to experience revenge has also been the catalyst of many horror films and novels in general, not just those dealing with sexual assault and rape.

The hybrid-genre's most well known and well labeled works are from the latter half of the 20th century, except the 1931's film A Woman Branded, which is about a woman who was raped and contracted venereal disease and seeks revenge on the man who raped her. It is possibly considered as the earliest precursor of the "rape and revenge" subgenre, retrospectively . Another earlier recorded rape and revenge genre film before the 1970s is the well known 1969 Malaysian film "6 Jahanam", the first and the earliest Malaysian rape and revenge genre film directed by P. Ramlee, also recorded as the first Asian brutal rape and revenge genre film.

=== The Virgin Spring ===
In 1960, the term ''rape and revenge" was coined in Ingmar Bergman's The Virgin Spring, considered the earliest film and precursor of the subgenre; the film is about a father who seeks vengeance on three herdsmen for the rape and murder of his daughter. This film, however, is technically a "Rape and Avenge" film as it is not the victim herself that does the killings. According to director Ingmar Bergman, inspiration for the film came from the legend of Per Töre, which he read as a student. Per Töre has seven daughters who fall victim to seven rapists. He was also heavily influenced by Japanese cinema, being particularly a fan of Rashomon (1950).

=== The Phantom of Soho ===
The 1964 movie The Phantom of Soho, based on a book by Bryan Edgar Wallace, was the first movie to have the rape-victim herself become a serial revenge killer. The production company CCC infused this storyline later into the iconography of the Giallo in co-producing the seminal The Bird with the Crystal Plumage that has a similar theme.

The 1973's film Thriller – A Cruel Picture definitively codified the ethics and development of the genre, although the film was banned in Sweden, where it was made.

=== Influences and pioneers ===
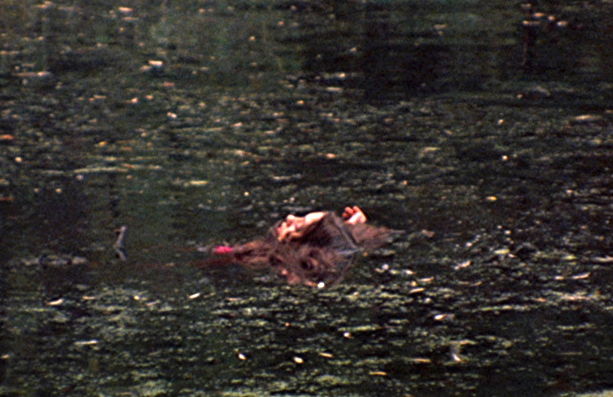
The Last House on the Left, depicted rape and graphic violence, drew substantial attention and is considered one of the pioneers in the subgenre.

The U.S. release of The Virgin Spring inspired Wes Craven's debut film The Last House on the Left, which is based on both Bergman's film and the Swedish ballad Töres döttrar i Wänge. Like Bergman's film, the plot of The Last House on the Left features the victim's parents exacting vengeance on their daughter's rapists. In some respects, the film was more brutal and controversial than Bergman's film, due to explicit rape and mutilation.

Filmmakers in the United States continued to produce rape and revenge films throughout the 1970s including Sam Peckinpah's Straw Dogs, Michael Winner's Death Wish, Lamont Johnson's Lipstick, and Meir Zarchi's I Spit on Your Grave; some of them were mainly distributed through mainstream theaters, while others were screened independently in underground cinemas as exploitation films.

In addition to American films, rape and revenge films have been made in the Philippines (e.g.; Lino Brocka's Insiang), Japan (e.g., Takashi Ishii's Freeze Me), Finland, Russia (The Voroshilov Sharpshooter), Argentina (e.g., I'll Never Die Alone; [2008]; original title: No Moriré Sola), and Norway (e.g., The Whore [2009]; original title: Hora).

Several female directors created films in this genre including Virginie Despentes' Baise-moi (2000), Coralie Fargeat's Revenge (2017), Jennifer Kent's The Nightingale (2018), and Emerald Fennell's Promising Young Woman (2020). The latter film revitalized the subgenre and garnered multiple awards and nominations.

Three Billboards Outside Ebbing, Missouri and Promising Young Woman are subverted examples of the subgenre where a character was raped and murdered off-screen before the protagonist seeks revenge, although both films lack the use of graphic violence and onscreen rape.

Some movies are usually not regarded as belonging to the subgenre, but may feature a "rape and revenge" subplot as part of their story. These include Stanley Kubrick's Clockwork Orange, Gaspar Noé's Irréversible, Quentin Tarantino's Pulp Fiction and Kill Bill, Lars von Trier's Dogville, and Paul Verhoeven's Elle.

=== Explanation of the subgenre ===
Rape and revenge films generally follow a three-act structure;

1. Rape: The main character / victim is (violently) raped and may be further abused, tortured, or left for dead.
2. Return: There are two potential outcomes of the violence against the victim:
  - The protagonist is devastated by the victim's death (if the protagonist is not themself the victim).
  - The victim survives, but barely, and rehabilitates themself.
3. Revenge: The main character/victim, sometimes with the assistance of a third-party, engages in a plot to exact vengeance and eliminate their rapist(s).

In Irréversible, the structure was reversed, with the first part depicting the revenge before tracing back the events which led to that point. Roger Ebert argues that, by using this structure as well as a false revenge, Irréversible cannot be classified as an exploitation film, as no exploitation of the subject matter takes place.

== Reception and legacy ==
The Virgin Spring received polarized reviews from critics, but subject to censorship since its U.S. release, and later won the Academy Award for Best Foreign Language Film, marked the first rape and revenge film to win an Academy Award. In retrospective years, the film renewed positively and expressed inspiration of several films, described as a relatively auspicious heritage to rape and revenge films.

The subgenre has attracted critical attention and controversy, especially when it is akin to horror cinema – is probably one of the most controversial genres, accused of voyeurism and complacency by its detractors. Much of this critical attention comes from feminist critics examining the complex politics involved in the genre and its impact on cinema more generally. More recently, a broad analysis of the rape-revenge genre and concept was published in Rape-Revenge Films: A Critical Study, by Alexandra Heller-Nicholas. The book argues against a simplistic notion of the term "rape-revenge" and suggests a film-specific approach in order to avoid generalizing films which may "diverge not over the treatment of sexual assault as much as they do in regard to the morality of the revenge act".

Rape and revenge films, like many horror films, cause controversy by making the audience complicit in the violence of the story. Because of this, both old and new films of the genre struggle with the balance of creating a realistic story that forces the audience to confront the horrifying reality, not putting so many horrifying things on the screen as to isolate your audience, and not making light or sexualizing the horrifying topics that do end up in the film. The controversy stems from the fact that films in the genre can often be accused of using the moral of the story as a pretext to justify extremely graphic murder and rape scenes. For example, I Spit on Your Grave, notable for its controversial depiction of extreme graphic violence and depictions of gang rape, sparked controversies with feminists protesting the movie and people accusing the movie of glorifying rape. The Motion Picture Association of America tried to prevent the film's producers from using the R rating. After the association gave the film an R rating, the producer of the film added rape scenes, making it an X-rated movie. Ultimately, an agreement was reached where the film removed any references or explicit shots referring to anal rape and the MPAA restored the original R rating. In an interview with Fangoria, director Meir Zarchi said as a response to the backlash:

"Frankly, I'm not concerned whether it receives bad press or not. It doesn't touch me one way or the other whatsoever. If you told me that the public does not like it and the critics like it, then there is something very, very bad about that. Who am I reaching? Three-hundred critics around the United States, or 2,000 around the world? It's really the public that counts, the 20 million who have seen the film around the globe."

The remaining films Irréversible, The Last House on the Left, and Thriller – A Cruel Picture continue to spark substantial attention and controversy, with Irréversible notable for nine-minute continuous rape scene and repeatedly bludgeon-to-death scene, prompting widespread outrage among audiences during the film's premiere, including the cast from the film, and film critics stormed out. The anime adaptation of Redo of Healer also attracted controversy for the first two episodes, depicting rape and graphic violence at one point as a plot device, with one review describes the anime:

"Redo of Healer may well be the most notorious and divisive anime series this season, in this case it earned a reputation for using revenge rape as a key recurring story element in the original material".

Despite this, the anime gained higher than average percentage of female viewers and novelist Rui Tsukiyo expressed their surprise on Twitter.

== See also ==
- B-movie
- Captivity narrative
- New Hollywood
- Vulgar auteurism
- American independent cinema
- Extreme cinema
- Midnight film
- Psychological fiction (drama, horror, thriller)
- Revenge tragedy
- Splatter film
- Social thriller
- Video nasty
- #MeToo movement
