= Sarah Butler (actress) =

American actress (born February 11th 1985)

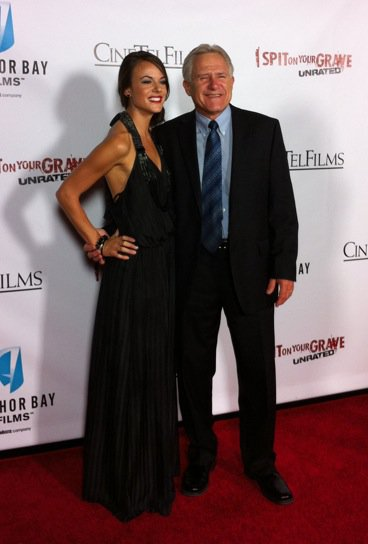
- Butler with her father at the premiere of I Spit on Your Grave in 2010
- Born: February 11th 1985; Puyallup, Washington, U.S.
- Occupation: Actress
- Years active: 2004–2020
- Spouse: Mel Elias (m. 2021)
- Children: 2

Sarah Butler (born February 11th, 1985) is an American actress. She is best known for playing the role of Jennifer Hills in the 2010 to 2015 I Spit on Your Grave film series. Her last appearance was the title character in the 2020 TV movie Woman on the Edge.

== Early life ==
Born on February 11th, 1985 in Puyallup, Washington, Butler was interested in the arts while growing up; she sang in choirs, entered singing competitions, and performed in high school and community theatre. She graduated from Rogers High School in 2003. Butler relocated to Los Angeles to study theatre at the University of Southern California, and then played Princess Belle in Beauty and the Beast, for a year and a half at Disneyland. She dropped out of college, focused on finding a talent agent, and began auditioning for work in television and film.

== Career ==
Butler guest-starred on the television series CSI: Miami and CSI: NY. She was cast in the film A Couple of White Chicks at the Hair Dresser and the 2008 Syfy TV horror film Flu Bird Horror. She had a role that year on the web series Luke 11:17, directed by Don Stark. She also had a recurring role on the web series I Heart Vampires.

Butler won the lead in the 2010 rape and revenge thriller I Spit on Your Grave, a remake of the 1978 cult film of the same title. Although initially put off by the film's nudity and violence, the film's strong character arc and "feminist edge" helped convince her to take the role. Butler starred as Jennifer Hills, a novelist who is brutally gang raped while staying at a cabin in the woods; her character then seeks revenge on her rapists.

Butler began filming the psychological thriller The Stranger Within, in Mallorca, Spain in November 2011. Butler then joined the cast of the independent thriller Treachery, which began filming in Los Angeles in June 2012. In 2013, Butler starred in the horror film The Demented, and the anthology film Tom Holland's Twisted Tales, playing a bomb disposal expert in the segment "Boom". In 2014, she played a murder victim in the episode "Once Upon a Time in the West" of the ABC television drama Castle.

In 2015, Butler reprised her role as Jennifer Hills in I Spit on Your Grave III: Vengeance Is Mine, a sequel to 2010's I Spit on Your Grave. In 2016, Butler co-starred in the 2016 Lifetime TV film Nightmare Nurse. and played a comedian in Debra Eisenstadt's film Before The Sun Explodes, which premiered at the South by Southwest film festival. Butler guest starred on the ABC television series Grey's Anatomy, playing Danielle in the episode "You Haven't Done Nothin'". In 2017, she starred with Charles Shaughnessy in Moontrap Target Earth, produced by the makers of the 1989 sci-fi film Moontrap. She also starred in the Lifetime TV film Infidelity in Suburbia as Laura, a woman who begins an extramarital relationship. Butler also appears in the film Doubting Thomas. in 2018, Butler joined the cast of writer/director Chris Blake's indie horror film All Light Will End, alongside Andy Buckley, John Schuck and Sam Jones III.

== Personal life ==
On June 10, 2021, she married musician Mel Elias, after seven years of dating.

== Filmography ==
Film
Year	Title	Role	Notes
2007	A Couple of White Chicks at the Hair Dresser	Marc's assistant	
2010	I Spit on Your Grave	Jennifer Hills	
2012	The Philly Kid	Amy	
2013	Treachery	Cecilia	
2013	The Demented	Sharley	
2013	The Stranger Within	Sarah	
2013	Twisted Tales	Jolene	Anthology film, segment: "Boom"
2014	Free Fall	Jane	
2015	I Spit on Your Grave III: Vengeance Is Mine	Jennifer Hills / Angela Jitrenka	
2016	Before The Sun Explodes	Holly	
2017	Moontrap: Target Earth	Scout	
2018	All Light Will End	Dianna	
2018	Doubting Thomas	Jen	
2018	Point Defiance	Detective Barnes	
2019	Drowning	Claire	
2020	Revenge for Daddy	Lisa	

Television
Year	Title	Role	Notes
2004	Love's a Trip	Contestant	
2008	Flu Bird Horror	Eva	Television film
2008	Luke 11:17	Sandy	Web series
2008	CSI: Miami	Kim Walderman	Episode: "Bombshell"
2009	CSI: NY	Alison Redman	Episode: "Green Piece"
2009–2010	I Heart Vampires	Paige	Web series
2014	Average Joe	Hostess	Episode: "The Birthday Blow-Out"
2014	Castle	Whitney Williams	Episode: "Once Upon a Time in the West"
2015	CSI: Cyber	Chelsea	Episode: "L0m1s"
2016	Nightmare Nurse	Brooke	Television film
2017	Infidelity in Suburbia	Laura Halpern	Television film
2017	Woman on the Run	Nomi Gardner	Television film
2017	NCIS	Nicole	Episode: "Ready or Not"
2018	Counterfeiting in Suburbia	Karen Cartwright	Television film
2020	Woman on the Edge	Karen Croft	Television film
