= Hidding =

Hidding is a surname. Notable people with the surname include:

- Friedrich Hidding (1926–2011), German field hockey player
- Rene Hidding (born 1953), Australian politician
- Tineke Hidding (born 1959), Dutch heptathlete

== See also ==
- Hiding (disambiguation)
