= Kelcey Ervick =

American academic, author and artist

Kelcey Ervick is professor of English and creative writing at Indiana University South Bend, a public university in South Bend, Indiana. She is the author of six books. Ervick has also published comics and illustrated work in The Washington Post, The Rumpus, The Indianapolis Review, Hypertext Magazine, and The Believer, amongst other publications. Ervick grew up in Ohio and currently lives in Indiana.

== Education ==
Ervick earned her Ph.D. from the University of Cincinnati in 2006 and a B.A. from Xavier University in 1993.

While at Xavier, Ervick played soccer and was a goalkeeper for four years. Ervick's career saves record (1990–1993) at Xavier stood until 2014.

== Career ==
At Indiana University South Bend, Ervick teaches classes in English, creative writing, and comics. Additionally, Ervick is the Director of Creative Writing. She also served as the faculty advisor for IU South Bend's literary journal from 2006 to 2011. Ervick has been teaching at Indiana University South Bend since 2006.

Ervick also teaches classes through Sequential Artists Workshop, including classes about graphic poetry and collage, and workshop sessions at the Midwest Writers Workshop.

Ervick's work has been featured on the Write-Minded Podcast and her artist practice as a graphic artist is described in Craft Literary, as well as Autobiographix. The Keeper, a book that intertwines a memoir of growing up playing soccer with the history of Title IX, was favorably reviewed in The New York Times, The Millions, NBC 24News, and the South Bend Tribune. Publishers Weekly described The Keeper as a "lively celebration of girl athletes and the role of sports and Title IX." More recently, her coedited volume, The Rose Metal Press Field Guide to Graphic Literature, was glowingly reviewed in Solrad, and in Compulsive Reader, which describes the editors as "deserving copious kudos" for this work.

== Awards ==
Ervick's work has been recognized with grants from the Indiana Arts Commission, the Sustainable Arts Foundation, and the New Frontiers in Arts and Humanities at Indiana University.

Ervick has been honored as a Meijer Visiting Writer at Central Michigan University. Ervick has given seminars at a variety of universities, including for the Creative Writing Reading Series in the Department of English at the University of Notre Dame and was a featured speaker for the Center of Excellence For Women & Technology.

The Keeper was awarded an Ohioana Book Award in 2023. For Sale By Owner was honored as a finalist for Best Books of Indiana, and as a winner of the Next Generation Indie Book Award for Short Fiction. Ervick has been a two-time Pushcart nominee.

== Works ==
=== Books ===
- The Rose Metal Press Field Guide to Graphic Literature, 2023, edited with Tom Hart
- The Keeper: Soccer, Me, and the Law that Changed Women's Lives, 2022, published by Avery/Penguin Random House
- Defunct, 2019, limited edition letterpress book hand printed and published by Book Arts Collaborative
- The Bitter Life of Božena Nemcová, 2016, published by Rose Metal Press
- Liliane's Balcony: A Novella of Fallingwater, 2013, published by Rose Metal Press
- For Sale By Owner, 2011, published by Kore Press

=== Other writing ===
- Short fiction in Stuck in the Middle, 2016, an anthology coedited by David Bell and Molly McCaffrey, published by Main Street Rag

=== Comics and illustrated work ===
- Title IX Became Law 50 Years Ago: Here's Why It Still Matters, 2022, The Washington Post
- On Falling in Love with Goalkeeping, 2022, Literary Hub
- Welcome to South Bend: The Lady Boxers, 2020, published in The Rumpus
- Welcome to South Bend: The Poetry of South Bend, 2020, published in The Rumpus
- The Habit of Art: Another Year of Daily Painting, 2019, published in The Rumpus
- Welcome to South Bend: A Weekend with the Boot Edge Edges, 2019, published in The Rumpus
- Welcome to South Bend: When Country Music Came to Town, 2019, published in The Rumpus
- Welcome to South Bend: A Love Story, 2019, published in The Rumpus
- Welcome to South Bend: Bailout Studebaker, 2019, published in The Rumpus
- Welcome to South Bend: Notre Dame Football, 2019, published in The Rumpus
- Welcome to South Bend: How to Change Your Name in Indiana, 2019, published in The Rumpus
- Welcome to South Bend: My Current Literary Crush, 2019, published in The Rumpus
- Welcome to South Bend: How to Get Out of Jury Duty, 2019, published in The Rumpus
- Welcome to South Bend: Mr. Answerpants, 2019, published in The Rumpus
- Welcome to South Bend: On the Map, 2019, published in The Rumpus
- My God, It's Been So Long, 2019, published in The Believer
- The Habit of Art: A Year of Daily Painting, 2018, published in The Rumpus
- Featured Artist: Kelcey Ervick, n.d., The Indianapolis Review
