= Daydream Believer (disambiguation) =

"Daydream Believer" is a song written by John Stewart and originally recorded by the Monkees.

Daydream Believer or Daydream Believers may also refer to:

- Daydream Believer (1992 film), an Australian film directed by Kathy Mueller
- Daydream Believer (2001 film), an American film directed by Debra Eisenstadt
- Daydream Believer and Other Hits, a 1998 compilation album by the Monkees
- Daydream Believers: The Monkees' Story, a 2000 made-for-television biographical film about the Monkees
- "Daydream Believer", the 20th episode of season 16 of Law & Order: Special Victims Unit
- "Daydream Believer", an episode of season one of My Life as a Teenage Robot
