= Smallville season 2 =

Season of television series

Smallville
- Season 2
- DVD cover featuring star Tom Welling
- Showrunners: Alfred Gough; Miles Millar
- Starring: Tom Welling; Kristin Kreuk; Michael Rosenbaum; Sam Jones III; Allison Mack; John Glover; Annette O'Toole; John Schneider
- No. of episodes: 23

Release
- Original network: The WB
- Original release: September 24, 2002 – May 20, 2003

Season chronology
- ← Previous; Season 1 Next → Season 3

The second season of Smallville, an American television series developed by Alfred Gough and Miles Millar, began airing on September 24, 2002, on The WB television network. The series recounts the early adventures of Kryptonian Clark Kent as he adjusts to life in the fictional town of Smallville, Kansas, during the years before he becomes Superman. The second season comprises 23 episodes and concluded its initial airing on May 20, 2003. Regular cast members during season two include Tom Welling, Kristin Kreuk, Michael Rosenbaum, Sam Jones III, Allison Mack, John Glover, Annette O'Toole, and John Schneider. Glover, who was a recurring guest in season one, was promoted to regular for season two. At the end of season one, Eric Johnson, who portrayed Whitney Fordman, had left the series.

Season two picks up directly where season one ended, with Clark (Welling) dealing with the aftermath of the tornadoes that hit Smallville. This season, Clark finally learns who he is and where he comes from, but must also acknowledge a potential destiny set into motion by his biological father that could change his life and the lives of those around him forever. Clark's relationship with Lana Lang (Kreuk) becomes increasingly closer, straining his friendship with Chloe Sullivan (Mack). Clark's best friend, Pete Ross (Jones III), learns Clark's secret this season.

Before the start of the second season, Gough and Millar established a writing staff to help develop episode stories for the show, which eventually saw the introduction of two characters that would shape Clark's life, Dr. Virgil Swann and Clark's biological father Jor-El. These roles were filled by Christopher Reeve and Terence Stamp, respectively, who were previously known for their respective roles as Superman and his nemesis General Zod in the Superman film series. Special effects company Entity FX became the primary effects unit for the show this season, winning awards for two of the episodes they worked on. Apart from the digital effects team, the series and its actors were nominated for and won various awards as well. Season two performed better than the previous season, averaging 6.3 million viewers a week, and placed #113 in the Nielsen ratings, up from #115 the year before.

== Episodes ==
No. overall	No. in season	Title	Directed by	Written by	Original release date	Prod. code	U.S. viewers (millions)
22	1	"Vortex"	Greg Beeman	Story by : Alfred Gough & Miles Millar; Teleplay by : Philip Levens	September 24, 2002	175051	8.66
Clark rescues Lana from the giant tornado which she was pulled into and takes her to the hospital. When he returns home, Clark learns that his ship is gone and that Jonathan chased Roger Nixon (Tom O'Brien) into the storm for attempting to expose Clark's secret. Lex is wracked with guilt over not helping Lionel sooner when the mansion ceiling collapses. Lex makes a decision to rush his father into surgery in an attempt to prevent him from becoming paralyzed. The surgery is successful but results in the loss of Lionel's eyesight. Jonathan and Nixon attempt to dig themselves out of the crypt they fell into after a mobile home dropped out of the sky on top of them. Clark and friends search for Jonathan. When Clark finds out that Lex knows Nixon, he starts to doubt Lex's intentions. Clark uses his X-ray vision and spots the crypt. He shows up before the two men lose all oxygen, but the meteor rocks in the crypt weaken him. Nixon takes advantage of the situation and kidnaps Clark. Jonathan chases him, but Nixon gets the upper hand. Lex shows up and saves Jonathan's life by shooting Nixon before he can kill Jonathan.
23	2	"Heat"	James Marshall	Mark Verheiden	October 1, 2002	175052	8.07
During a record heat wave, Clark develops a new ability, heat vision, which causes him to have uncontrollable bursts of heat from his eyes. Clark quickly learns that his flare-ups are based on a state of sexual arousal, having started a fire at school and the local coffee shop while with Lana. With Jonathan's help, Clark is able to gain control over his new ability. Meanwhile, Lex marries Desirée Atkins (Krista Allen), a woman he barely knows and Clark's new biology teacher. Desirée has the ability to control men with pheromones enhanced by the meteor rock. Desirée attempts to use her pheromones on Clark, but he is resistant. As a result, Desirée uses her abilities on Jonathan, convincing him to kill Lex so that she can inherit his fortune. Clark manages to save Lex before either Jonathan or Desirée can kill him.
24	3	"Duplicity"	Steve Miner	Todd Slavkin & Darren Swimmer	October 8, 2002	175053	8.82
Pete unknowingly discovers Clark's spaceship in a cornfield and makes plans to sell the story to the media. Against his parents' wishes, Clark decides to tell Pete the truth about his alien origins in an effort to keep Pete from telling anyone about the ship. Pete, more upset over Clark's dishonesty than the fact that he is an alien, leaves. Dr. Steven Hamilton (Joe Morton), suffering from overexposure to the meteor rocks, steals the spaceship. When Lex refuses to believe his rants about a ship, Hamilton seeks support from Lionel. After realizing that the ship requires a key to open it, Hamilton kidnaps Pete in an effort to find out where the key is. Hamilton threatens Pete's life before Clark arrives and rescues Pete. In the process, Hamilton has a violent convulsion, as a result of his condition, and dies. After returning the ship to the Kent farm, Pete and Clark reconcile.
25	4	"Red"	Jeff Woolnough	Jeph Loeb	October 15, 2002	175054	8.89
Clark goes against his father's wishes and purchases an expensive Class ring. Unbeknownst to him, the ring contains a red meteor rock, something he had previously never seen. The red meteor rock affects Clark mentally, stripping away his inhibitions. With his restraint gone, Clark begins to act out of character. Clark asks Lana out on a date, but ditches her in the middle for another girl when Lana does not like how he is acting. Showing resentment toward his parents for forcing him to live the life of a farm boy, Clark decides to use his abilities to become rich and leave Smallville. Pete and Jonathan must work together to stop Clark, who goes after the same young girl and her father who are on the run from mobsters. Using the green meteor rock to weaken Clark, Jonathan smashes the ring with a sledgehammer. Later, Clark tries to apologize to his parents, but Jonathan suspects that Clark was expressing his true feelings.
26	5	"Nocturne"	Rick Wallace	Brian Peterson & Kelly Souders	October 22, 2002	175055	8.29
While visiting her parents' grave, Lana finds a love poem left for her. The poem was written by a boy named Byron Moore (Sean Faris), whose parents (Richard Moll and Gwynyth Walsh) never allowed him to leave the house. Clark and Lana suspect that Byron is being abused, but when the police investigate Byron's parents, they say he died years earlier. Clark and Pete break into the home the next day and find Byron locked in the basement. When Byron is brought into the sunlight, he starts to act like a beast with superhuman strength. It is revealed that Byron had a deadly disease and was a test subject for one of LuthorCorp's projects run by Lionel. Byron goes after Lionel, but Clark tracks him down and slams him into a well shaft and out of the sunlight. The darkness returns Byron to normal long enough for Clark, with Lex's help, to get Byron to the hospital where he is placed under special lights. Meanwhile, Martha takes a position as Lionel's personal assistant, much to the dismay of Jonathan and Clark.
27	6	"Redux"	Chris Long	Russel Friend & Garrett Lerner	October 29, 2002	227621	8.22
When a student is pulled out of the school pool, having aged 60 years in a few seconds, Clark and Chloe decide to investigate. They discover an 80-year trail of similar events left behind by Chrissy Parker (Maggie Lawson), another student at Smallville High, and deduce that she is draining the life force from her victims in order to stay young. Chrissy goes after the new school principal, but Clark manages to get there in time to stop her. Without a fresh victim, Chrissy's body begins to age rapidly until she deteriorates into dust. Meanwhile, Lana discovers a photo of her mother in a romantic pose with an unidentified man during a period of time when she believed her parents were happily married. Lana asks Lex to investigate who the man is, and she eventually learns that her parents were legally separated at the time of the photo and that the man in the photo could be her biological father.
28	7	"Lineage"	Greg Beeman	Story by : Alfred Gough & Miles Millar; Teleplay by : Kenneth Biller	November 5, 2002	175056	9.38
A woman named Rachel Dunleavy (Blair Brown) shows up claiming to be Clark's biological mother and that Lionel was his biological father. Clark finds the truth about his adoption. Clark dismisses her claims, but Rachel files a court order to have a DNA test performed. Clark and Pete sneak into the testing labs and Clark swaps his DNA for Pete's so that the technicians do not figure out that he is not human. When the results come back negative, Rachel kidnaps Lex in an effort to force Lionel to admit that he fathered a child with her and that Clark is their son. Rachel witnesses Clark using his abilities when he rescues Lex and realizes that he is not her son. Lionel later admits to Lex that he did father another child, but that it died as an infant. Later, Lionel is seen with a locket and a picture of a young boy. Meanwhile, Lana finds the man from the photo, Henry Small (Patrick Cassidy), who eventually agrees to do a DNA test to determine if he is her father.
29	8	"Ryan"	Terrence O'Hara	Philip Levens	November 12, 2002	175057	7.35
After his aunt abandons him because she can't handle his secret, Ryan (Ryan Kelley) phones Clark for help. Clark rescues Ryan from the Summerholt facility, where the boy was being held as an unwilling subject of experimentation by Dr. Lawrence Garner (Martin Cummins), and brings him back to Smallville. He soon finds out that Ryan has a tumor in his brain, and that he only has a couple days left to live.
30	9	"Dichotic"	Craig Zisk	Mark Verheiden	November 19, 2002	175058	8.26
Ian Randall (Jonathan Taylor Thomas), a straight-A student, has the ability to duplicate himself. He uses his power to take extra classes and to date Lana and Chloe at the same time. Clark and Pete reveal Ian's secret, which induces Ian to try to kill both girls. Meanwhile, Lex attends an anger management session, where he meets Dr. Helen Bryce (Emmanuelle Vaugier).
31	10	"Skinwalker"	Marita Grabiak	Story by : Mark Warshaw; Teleplay by : Brian Peterson & Kelly Souders	November 26, 2002	175059	8.55
Clark stumbles into a local Native American cave, located below a new LuthorCorp construction site, and discovers symbols in an alien language on the cave walls. A local Native American, Joseph Willowbrook (Gordon Tootoosis) and his granddaughter Kyla (Tamara Feldman), say the drawings in the cave show the story of Naman, a hero from folklore who falls from the stars. Kyla tells Clark that in the legend, Naman has the strength of multiple men and can set items to flame with his eyes and that Naman fell in love with a woman and their descendants live to this day. Clark believes Naman might be from this planet. Kyla uses her skin-walking ability to halt the LuthorCorp project, but she is mortally injured during her attack on Lionel and later dies in the woods in Clark's arms.
32	11	"Visage"	William Gereghty	Todd Slavkin & Darren Swimmer	January 14, 2003	175060	7.27
Whitney Fordman (Eric Johnson) returns from overseas, claiming to have lost some of his memory during battle. Clark discovers that Whitney is actually Tina Greer (Lizzy Caplan), who says she realises now she was in love with Lana but never knew it or how to handle it. Meanwhile, Lex discovers that Helen had a secret meeting with his father and believes she was also sent as a spy, so he confronts her and she tells him not to disrespect her by implying she could be bought and they break up. Tina believes Clark got his powers from the meteor shower as she did and knows the meteor rocks weaken him. She asks Lana for her necklace while prentending to be Whitney and uses it to immobilise Clark in the storm cellar when his spaceship saves him. Tina approaches Lana in Clark's body to confess her love and they kiss. At the hospital, Lex and Helen meet again and she tells him his father had offered her money to break up with Lex. He apologises for his words and they make up. When Clark appears to get Lana, he and Tina fight as doubles and he tells her there is no need to hurt anyone for her love. During the altercation, Tina accidentally impales herself and dies. She uses her last words to ask Clark to take care of Lana. It is later revealed that the real Whitney was killed in action.
33	12	"Insurgence"	James Marshall	Kenneth Biller & Jeph Loeb	January 21, 2003	175062	6.62
After Lex loses a 150 million dollar contract, he discovers that his mansion is full of listening devices planted by Lionel. Lex starts a plan to bug LuthorCorp's headquarters, but aborts when he finds out that Martha and Lionel are headed there. The abort is botched when the workers want to steal from the LuthorCorp vault. While held hostage, Martha learns that Lionel has files on Clark and bars of refined meteor rock. She also retrieves the octagonal disc and stores it in a flour jar in the kitchen.
34	13	"Suspect"	Kenneth Biller	Mark Verheiden & Philip Levens	January 28, 2003	175061	7.46
Lionel is mysteriously shot at the Luthor mansion, leaving behind a huge list of suspects with various motives to want him dead. Jonathan, who is found unconscious in his truck with a bottle of tequila and a gun in his hand, is arrested as the prime suspect. Clark and Pete investigate and discover an elaborate plan orchestrated by Sheriff Ethan Miller (Mitchell Kosterman) to get revenge on Lionel for the bad things that LuthorCorp did.
35	14	"Rush"	Rick Rosenthal	Todd Slavkin & Darren Swimmer	February 4, 2003	175063	8.13
Pete and Chloe are infected by bug-like creatures that burrow into the necks of those who get close enough. The bugs cause people to engage in extremely risky behavior. Meanwhile, Clark finally asks Lana on a date. This infuriates a jealous Chloe who tells Clark that she wants him and kisses him in front of Lana. Pete uses a red meteor rock to get Clark to join them in their adrenaline-rushing behavior. Chloe tries to seduce Clark, and the rock is incidentally removed, restoring Clark to his normal self. Clark manages to get both his friends to the hospital, but he ruins his evening with Lana. Lex hires Dr. Frederick Walden (Rob LaBelle), an expert in ancient glyphs, to try to translate the language found on the walls of the Kawatche Caves.
36	15	"Prodigal"	Greg Beeman	Brian Peterson & Kelly Souders	February 11, 2003	175064	7.43
Lex discovers that his half-brother Lucas (Paul Wesley) is still alive. Lionel has been looking after Lucas, and he uses him to steal Lex's inheritance, so he cannot buy out LuthorCorp. Penniless, Lex moves in with the Kents. Lucas, dissatisfied with Lionel's plans for him, discovers that Lionel has been faking blindness for a while. An elaborate scheme with Lex reveals Lionel's lie and Lex secures his inheritance.
37	16	"Fever"	Bill Gereghty	Matthew Okumura	February 18, 2003	175065	7.85
Martha, who has been hiding the key to the spaceship, becomes extremely sick from inhaling the dust of green meteor rock that was underground. The Kent farm is quarantined and the key gets discovered. Clark, who inhaled the meteor dust as well, falls sick too. While Clark is unconscious, Chloe reads him a note describing her love for him only to have him mumble Lana's name in his sleep. After testing his blood, Helen realizes that Clark is different. Martha is revealed to be pregnant after the ship removes her poisoning.
38	17	"Rosetta"	James Marshall	Alfred Gough & Miles Millar	February 25, 2003	175066	8.73
Clark decides to place the key into a slot in the cave wall. Upon inserting the key, the wall instills him with the language of the cave. Walden discovers the key and uses it himself, but the information overload puts him in a coma. At home, Clark's heat vision forces him to etch a symbol onto the barn door. He is contacted by Dr. Virgil Swann (Christopher Reeve), who educates Clark about Krypton, his home planet. Using the key on the ship, he uncovers a hidden message from his biological father stating that his destiny is to conquer Earth.
39	18	"Visitor"	Rick Rosenthal	Philip Levens	April 15, 2003	175067	5.91
A classmate at school, Cyrus Krupp (Jer Adrianne Lelliott), displays special healing abilities. Clark discovers that Cyrus believes he is an alien who arrived during the meteor shower, leading him to believe Swann was wrong when he told Clark he was the only Kryptonian on Earth. Cyrus shows Clark the transmission tower he is building to contact his alien parents, but evidence surfaces that proves that Cyrus is human.
40	19	"Precipice"	Thomas J. Wright	Clint Carpenter	April 22, 2003	175068	6.70
After Lana is assaulted by a college student, Andy Conners (Michael Adamthwaite), Clark loses control and seems to injure the boy. When the Kents are sued for punitive damages, Clark begins to question his powers while trying to find a way out of the lawsuit. It is later revealed that Andy was faking his injuries, and, thanks to a plan concocted by Lana, Clark, and Chloe, he is exposed. Meanwhile, Helen's ex-boyfriend Paul Hayden (Anson Mount) arrives in town, intent on winning her back. When she turns him down, he stabs her, prompting Lex to take the law into his own hands.
41	20	"Witness"	Rick Wallace	Mark Verheiden	April 29, 2003	175069	6.50
Eric Marsh (Zachery Ty Bryan), a baseball player at Smallville High, hijacks a LuthorCorp van along with two other thieves and steals a shipment of refined green meteor rock. Clark stumbles upon the robbery, but is no match for them. It turns out that Eric and his crew are manufacturing and inhaling liquid kryptonite, which leads to enhanced strength which rivals that of Clark. Eventually, however, Jonathan reminds a discouraged Clark that although Eric's gang has strength, they don't have any of Clark's other powers. As a result, Clark is able to subdue the trio of thieves and prevent them from pulling another job. Meanwhile, Lionel offers to fund the Torch and a position at the Daily Planet to Chloe.
42	21	"Accelerate"	James Marshall	Story by : Todd Slavkin & Darren Swimmer; Teleplay by : Brian Peterson & Kelly Souders	May 6, 2003	175070	7.03
Lana thinks she is seeing ghosts, when an old childhood friend, Emily Eve Dinsmore (Jodelle Ferland), who died six years earlier, appears. Clark discovers that the child is indeed real. By moving extremely fast, the girl seems to disappear and walk through walls. Clark learns that Emily's father has been cloning her, with the help of green meteor rock. The flaw with the Emily clone is that she has no sense of morality, which eventually puts Lana in danger. Meanwhile, Lex prepares for his wedding with Helen.
43	22	"Calling"	Terrence O'Hara	Kenneth Biller	May 13, 2003	175071	7.06
Walden wakes up from his coma and tells Lex and Lionel that Clark is an alien that must be destroyed. A romantic encounter between Clark and Lana is quickly dismissed when Chloe finds out they are together. During a rehearsal for Lex and Helen's wedding, Clark hears a strange voice calling from the storm cellar.
44	23	"Exodus"	Greg Beeman	Alfred Gough & Miles Millar	May 20, 2003	175072	7.53
The will of Clark's biological father Jor-El (voiced by Terence Stamp) informs Clark he must leave Smallville. Not wanting to leave his family and friends, Clark steals Lionel's copy of the spaceship key made out of refined green meteor rock and sticks it into the ship, destroying it. The blast from the explosion causes Martha to lose her baby. Grief stricken, Clark starts using red kryptonite and decides to leave Smallville as Jor-El's voice is heard stating to Clark that he can't avoid his destiny. During his honeymoon flight, Lex wakes to find the plane going down and Helen and the pilot missing.

== Cast and characters ==
=== Main ===
- Tom Welling as Clark Kent
- Kristin Kreuk as Lana Lang
- Michael Rosenbaum as Lex Luthor
- Sam Jones III as Pete Ross (Note: Absent in one episode)
- Allison Mack as Chloe Sullivan
- John Glover as Lionel Luthor (Note: Absent in ten episodes)
- Annette O'Toole as Martha Kent
- John Schneider as Jonathan Kent

=== Recurring ===
- Patrick Cassidy as Henry Small
- Mitchell Kosterman as Sheriff Ethan Miller
- Emmanuelle Vaugier as Dr. Helen Bryce

== Production ==
=== Writing ===
"As a writer, you only have so many tricks in your bag. It's always about expanding the world and deepening the relationships".
— Alfred Gough on having a writing staff

At the start of the second season, developers and showrunners Alfred Gough and Miles Millar brought in Ken Biller to run the newly formed writers' room. For the first season, Gough and Millar usually wrote the final draft of every episode because they were still seeking the show's voice. The pair understood that a writing staff would help "expand [the] show". As part of their expanding, they also brought in comic-book writer Jeph Loeb, who spent his first two weeks seeking fresh ideas for new episodes. One of the decisions the new writing team came up with was letting Pete Ross in on Clark Kent's secret. The decision to let Pete learn Clark's secret was a choice made so that the character would have a function on the show, and allow Clark someone who was not one of his parents. It was also a way to examine the "power of friendship and loyalty", and "the price of having to keep a secret".

Not all of Smallville's stories this season came from the writing staff. Mark Warshaw, who was head of the internet team that wrote the online Smallville articles for the Ledger and Torch, which interwove the television episodes with online, fictional newspapers that continued the stories from the show, was the one that came up with the idea behind "Skinwalker". Warshaw's story was about a Native American girl who falls in love with Clark, while at the same time revealing Clark's destiny to him. The story was bought and given to Kelly Souders and Brian Peterson on the writing staff to work on a screenplay. The episode had a significant role in the series, as it introduced the Kawatche caves—which held the Kryptonian language written on its walls—and explored Clark's origins, while at the same time posing the question that people from Clark's homeworld may have visited Smallville before Clark arrived on the planet.

==== Superman mythology ====
For the second season, Gough and Millar brought in Christopher Reeve, who portrayed Superman in four feature films, as a guest star for a pivotal role in Clark's life, that of Dr. Virgil Swann. The pair always had intentions of bringing Reeve onto the show, and when they found out that he enjoyed watching the show himself, Gough and Millar decided that they were going to bring him on for season two. They had already crafted a character, Swann, they knew would reveal the truth about Krypton to Clark, and they decided that Reeve would be perfect for the part. Gough and Millar believed it was "natural" for Reeve to be the one to educate Clark about his past, and help him see his future, and the scenes between Reeve and Welling have been described as a "passing of the torch" moment for the series. Along with Reeve, another actor from the Superman films to be brought into the show was Terence Stamp, who portrayed General Zod in the first two Superman films, as the voice of Jor-El. Stamp's role as Zod in the films, coupled with how the writing team portrayed Jor-El's early appearances—giving Clark a message that he will rule Earth with strength—led to fan theories that Jor-El was in fact Zod at the ComicCon that met two months after the episode aired. Gough assured the ComicCon audience that the character was Jor-El, and not Zod in disguise.

In addition, Loeb requested the introduction of Superman's future ally, Metropolis Police Lieutenant Maggie Sawyer, for the episode "Insurgence". As Loeb recalls: "Ken [Biller] had written a hard-bitten, crusty kind of cop. I asked him if he minded if it was a woman, and explained who Maggie Sawyer was and the role she would play in the future". The concept for "Insurgence" also developed from an aspect of the Superman mythology that stemmed back to Superman's original incarnation, which was his ability to leap tall buildings in a single bound. After their Thanksgiving break, the Smallville writers were in the writers' room when Millar walked in and exclaimed, "I think it's time for Clark to leap a tall building". Loeb and the other writers had already been trying to develop a story that involved a hostage situation, and after Millar made his announcement, the team suggested that they also pay homage to the action film Die Hard (1988). The setting for the hostage situation was LuthorCorp Plaza; the team introduced the Daily Planet, another pivotal piece of Superman lore that would one day employ Clark and his alternate identity of Superman, by using it as the building that Clark uses to execute his "first leap". "Insurgence" was actually written before "Visage" and "Suspect", but not filmed until after both of those episodes because the team was having difficulty figuring out the logistics of producing the episode. Afterward, the episode would be scheduled to air between "Visage" and "Suspect".

This season also saw the introduction of red kryptonite. In the fourth episode, "Red", Clark buys a high school ring that contains a red kryptonite gem. The effects of the kryptonite were meant to act as a metaphor for drugs. Loeb was given the task of writing "Red" by Gough and Millar, and one of the things he decided on was that the ultimate pay off with the kryptonite would be Clark finally kissing Lana Lang. As Tom Welling describes it: "With 'Red Clark' he's completely aware of the consequences of his actions at the time, but he doesn't care! He doesn't care what happens to you, and he certainly doesn't care what happens to himself, because he probably realizes that nothing can happen to him. It's always fun to be that way, even in real life, because we're not allowed to be that way all too often". One of the concerns for the episode was whether the audience would embrace the idea of a "bad Clark", as Biller knew that Clark would have to be "the villain of the story", but audiences did embrace the idea and after the good ratings "Red" received, The WB requested more episodes with red kryptonite. In contrast, Gough and the crew did not like using it because of the idea of "Clark [turning] bad", but the team asked themselves, "what if a friend slips something in your drink and you don't know it?". This became the basis in "Rush", where Pete slips a shard of red kryptonite into Clark's pocket; it also gave the network what they wanted, but in the form of a single act instead of the entire episode. This element would show up again in the season finale, when Clark slips on another red kryptonite ring before riding out of Smallville on a motorcycle. According to Biller, the moment Clark goes searching for the kryptonite is the payoff they had wanted with that piece of Superman mythology. The show had established that red kryptonite removes Clark's inhibitions, and in the season finale, Clark is to the point that he is willing to "go 'on drugs' to solve his own pain and [...] guilt about what he's done".

Apart from the classical Superman mythology, the creative team developed more of the show's take on Superman lore. In this instance, the Smallville team wanted to get rid of Clark's spaceship in the finale, because they felt that the characters would not realistically travel to the storm cellar that often. With the introduction of the Kawatche caves in season two, the creative team had the Kryptonian connection they needed in order to safely rid themselves of the spaceship. "Rush" provided an expansion on the mythology within the show as well, by explaining that Kryptonians had been to Smallville before Clark.

==== Characters ====
Season two expanded the lives and relationships of the main characters. Gough and Millar used the season opener, "Vortex", to establish multiple dynamics for the seasons, including: "Lana's distrust of Clark; what happened to the spaceship, which [developed into] Clark looking into his origins; Lex protecting Clark and killing the reporter; and the Lex/Lionel dynamic, with Lionel being blind".

A second development for the show was the relationship between Lionel and Martha Kent. As part of season two was about expanding the lives of the adults away from Clark, "Nocturne" saw the beginning of the Lionel/Martha relationship. This relationship allowed for more situations of John Schneider and Annette O'Toole doing scenes together that were not about the kids. By the end of the season, each of the main characters reach turning points in their lives. Welling also commented on his character's development over the course of the season, specifically on Clark meeting his biological father and how that affects his life: "To have two very strong father figures telling you different things is a lot to handle, and Clark has to take this information, put it to the test and come to his own conclusion, and it's not an easy one".

"You've got Clark dealing with his father and his destiny and trying to overcome it. He's trying to continue to be [who] he believes himself to be. [...] Then you've got Lex and Helen and their [...] problems [...] Lana and Clark are dealing with their issues too [...] She's watching him fall apart, and that's really difficult for her because he never tells [her] what's going on".
— Kristin Kreuk on where the characters ended up by the season finale.

According to Gough, they had a specific intention for the ending of the second season: "Season one ended with the height of heroism, with Clark running into a tornado to save Lana. For season two, we wanted to see the nadir of that, which is Clark running away [...] from his problems". Gough likens the finale to the ending of The Empire Strikes Back (1980), in that Clark leaves Smallville and everyone he loves because he is scared. In order to do "the character justice", they have to take his journey through the darkness, with him failing along the way.

The lives of multiple characters changed during season two, including that of Whitney Fordman, who left Smallville in season one. Whitney would return in season two's "Visage", when the creative team decided to combine two of their favorite characters from season one: the series regular Whitney, and Tina Greer, the shape shifting teenager with a fixation on Lana. The result was Whitney's return from war with amnesia, and subsequent revealing that Whitney died overseas and that Tina has been impersonating him since his "return". The episode also held lesbian undertones between the characters of Tina and Lana, as well as with Tina and Chloe Sullivan. As Greg Beeman points out, Tina's ultimate goal was to take over Whitney's life and live forever with Lana; the character also "lusted over Chloe" during a portion of the episode.

Whitney was not the only character whose fate was met with demise. "Suspect" became the show's first "cracking the mystery" episode, which revolved with the attempted murder of Lionel by a mysterious assailant; it was influenced by the Japanese film Rashomon (1950), just like season one's episode "Zero", which is told from different people's perspective of the same event. It was originally decided that Lionel's assistant, Dominic Santori, was going to be the person who attempted to kill Lionel, but ultimately it was decided that Sheriff Ethan Miller would be villain of the episode. Although Jonathan Kent was also a suspect, it was clear to at least Beeman that they could not pin the crime on a series regular, so they decided to try to surprise the audience by making it Ethan. Mitchell Kosterman, who plays Ethan, was a little distraught over his character's fate, having grown comfortable with his place on the show. The original ending of the episode featured Ethan taking a nurse hostage, which Kosterman felt was out of character; subsequently, the final version shows Ethan giving up when he finds out he's been caught. To Kosterman, this ending allows the character to stay sympathetic, by showing that he was "pushed to a bad place", because Kosterman feels "that whole dynamic of good people being pushed to do the wrong thing by bad people like Lionel Luthor is a pervading theme in the whole show".

The fate of Dr. Helen Bryce, who would marry Lex in the season two finale, was already established by the time the creative team was working on "Precipice", the season's nineteenth episode, though it did change from the writers' original intentions. Initially, the character was to be killed off at the end of the season, on her wedding day, but the quality of Emmanuelle Vaugier's performances and her chemistry with Michael Rosenbaum inspired the creative staff to keep her around until the start of the third season.

==== Episode development ====
Although the majority of the season two episodes were conceived during pre-production, as well as during the filming of the second season, other episode ideas, or scenes, were originally intended to be scripted for the first season. A scene involving Clark inadvertently using heat vision in his sexual education class was originally scripted for the pilot, but was cut when the budget became too large. That scene would become the inspiration for the season two episode "Heat". Since his initial performance as Ryan in season one's "Stray", Gough and Millar had hoped to be able to bring Ryan Kelley back to Smallville. In season two they got their chance, with the intention to kill off the character, who was suffering from a brain tumor. Gough and Millar were initially apprehensive about how audiences would react to the death of a young teenager whose age was representative of the target demographic. For the episode "Ryan", the creative team wanted to show that Clark, even with all his powers, cannot save everyone; in this case, Clark's speed and strength are no help against the tumor growing in Ryan's brain. The episode is about Clark's trials of learning that life is not easy, and how those trials change him. "Lineage" was one of the original stories Gough and Millar pitched to the studio when they were first trying to get Smallville off the ground. The episode was designed to explain why Jonathan hated Lionel—having made a deal with him in order to be able to adopt Clark—as well as set up the character of Lex's half brother, Lucas, in the forthcoming episode "Prodigal". As he wrote the episode, per Millar's suggestion, Biller drew inspiration from the film Lone Star (1996) when writing the flashback scenes. In Lone Star, to illustrate the moment of flashback, the camera would pan around until it revealed the past.

As with season one, the writing team came up with more "what if" episodes for the series, like season two's "Visitor", which came from the idea of, "what if someone showed up and Clark began to believe that he wasn't the last person from his planet". In the case of "Nocturne", "what if Clark had been brought up by different parents?". With "Nocturne", the episode is meant to be "an extreme version of the Clark story". As Gough explained: "Here's a kid with a condition, whose parents literally lock him in the basement. It's an extreme parenting episode—contrasting how these parents deal with Byron, and how the Kents deal with Clark". The episode also dealt with Clark's fallibility, in the fact that Clark is only a teenager, and he does not always have all of the facts; just because he thinks he is doing the right thing does not necessarily mean that he is. In this case, Clark believes that he is saving Byron from his abusive parents. Gough clarified: "[Clark]'s doing what he thinks is right, but ultimately unleashes the kid, and [Byron] causes damage. Just because you have the power and you think you're right doesn't always mean you're taking the right course of action". Another "what if" episode was "Witness", which originally came from the concept, "what if Clark witnessed a crime and had to testify in court as to why he was standing in the middle of the road at 2 o'clock in the morning?" In the end, the court angle was dropped from the storyline, with Clark making an anonymous phone call to the sheriff and eventually having to battle the three kryptonite powered thieves that he had witnessed stealing.

"Witness" is not the only episode to be altered from its original concept. "Dichotic" began, in its early stages, as a story about a news reporter who had the ability—thanks to kryptonite—to split himself in half. The reporter would create the news at the same time that he was filming it. Biller and Mark Verheiden discussed a teaser that involved the reporter pushing someone out of a window and as the body plummeted to the ground the audience saw the same person reporting the news as it happened. The main story would focus on the reporter attempting to assassinate Lex, but it eventually evolved into what Biller refers to as "a metaphor on trying to super-achieve at high school". In the revamped version, a high school student uses his ability to duplicate himself so that he can take classes in high school and at the community college at the same time, in an effort to win a LuthorCorp scholarship and go to the university of his dreams. With Jonathan Taylor Thomas playing the over-achieving student, the character of Ian Randall was also used to stir up the Lana-Clark-Chloe triangle. Beeman explained that a problem existed in developing new storylines involving the characters: "We want the characters we're familiar with, and on the other [hand], you have to search for ways to change them up". Even the ending was altered during filming, as both copies of Ian were to fall over the edge of a bridge; then, as the two Ians fall they touch each other's fingers slowly fusing together before hitting the ground. The team was so impressed with Thomas's performance they opted to keep the character alive.

The twenty-second episode of the season, "Calling", initially had a different opening sequence involving Clark and Lana. In the original version, Clark and Lana were staying up late to watch a comet through Clark's telescope. Through the dialogue exchange between Clark and Lana, there was supposed to be a correlation between the arrival of the comet and Clark and Lana's relationship status. The comet also signified the arrival of Jor-El, Clark's biological father, and Clark's departure from Smallville. The effect for the comet was expensive however, and if they cut the comet they had to cut the dialogue because it would have made no sense if someone sees the comet. Instead, the scene was rewritten to be about Lana visiting Clark at midnight to celebrate his birthday.

=== Filming ===
The first episodes filmed for season two was actually the sixth episode aired; "Redux" finished principal photography shortly after filming for "Tempest" ended, which was just before the crew went on their summer break. With "Redux" filming directly after the season one finale, the cast and crew were required to forgo the immediateness of their summer break so they could film; it was not aired in season two until the sixth scheduled airdate because of complications that arose after filming had ended. During the summer hiatus, after director Chris Long finished working on his cut of the film, it was decided the episode needed more visual effects. Since the shots were not originally planned, Entity FX, the show's special effects contractor, had to create completely new shots.

"[In season two's "Redux"], the idea wasn't to do something soap opera-y. As Clark was finding out about his origins, [Lana] was finding out about hers, and trying to forge connections with [her father]. And what would that be like? That was another storyline where there were several episodes where we shot three or four scenes, and by the time it was cut for time there'd be one scene that might seem to come out of nowhere. That can be frustrating. That's just the limitations of TV. If an episode comes in at fifty-four minutes and it's got to be forty-two minutes, you end up chopping lots out, particularly character stuff that focuses on guest characters—we always keep the Clark/Lana scenes!"

— Ken Biller on television limitations

The production crew attempted to use money saving techniques when it came time to film scenes in locations other than the usual spots—the Kent farm, Luthor mansion, Smallville High, and the Talon. For instance, the Kent barn was redesigned as Dr. Steven Hamilton's lab for the final climax in "Duplicity". When it came time to create the Kawatche caves for "Skinwalker", the production crew built on a sound stage in Vancouver. The team created movable pieces, which allowed them to rearrange the set, and give the effect that it was larger than it really was. The production team also used sandstone to give the impression that the caves may have once been a riverbed, and thus allowing the crew to not have to worry about putting a ceiling on the set.

When the crew cannot get away with using a sound stage they have to scout actual locations that reflect a similar look to what needs to be filmed; sometimes those on-location shots create problems for the crew. Pitt Meadows, in the Fraser Valley east of Vancouver, subbed for the Indonesian landscape the crew needed for the sequence of Whitney's ultimate demise during battle "Visage". This location presented its own problems for the crew, as the swampy waters of the river slowed production as well as the limited daylight available—in November, there is only six hours of daylight in the Pitt Meadow's region. The crew had to return eight days before the scheduled airdate for the episode in order to shoot close-ups of Whitney and the rest of the soldiers. The location that was scouted for the river scene, where Emily Dinsmore pushes Lana off a bridge and into a river, became problematic on the first day of shooting. The river had become too dangerous to shoot the water scenes, so they simply tied Kreuk to a safety line and had Jodelle Micah Ferland (Emily) push her over the edge, but without her actually going into the water. They moved the set to a sound stage where they filmed Kreuk's remaining scenes—where Welling dives into the river to save her—in a water tank.

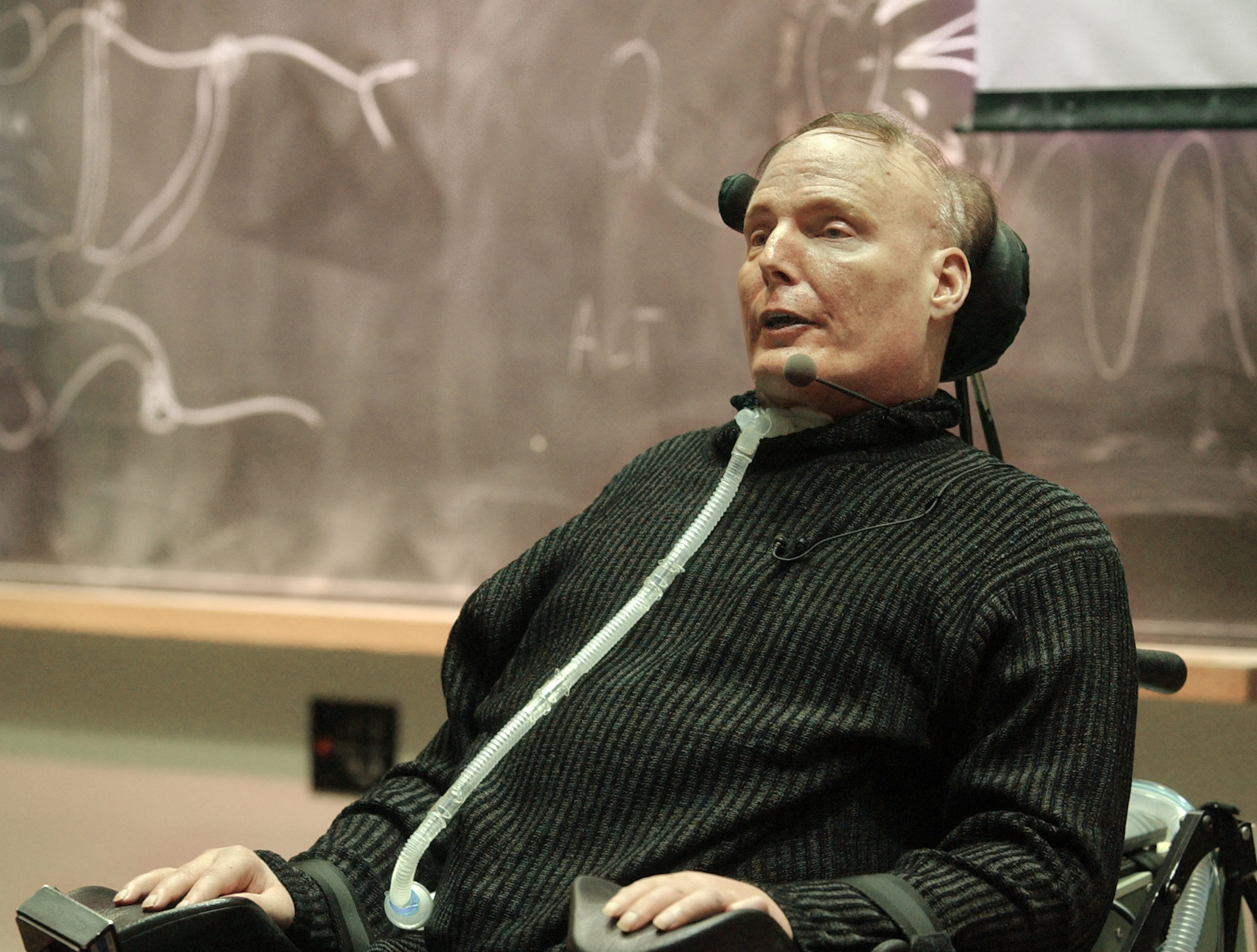
Christopher Reeve, speaking at an MIT event. In order to accommodate the necessary assistance Reeve required for his paralysis, the Smallville crew met him in New York to film his scenes for the show.

For season two's "Rosetta", the crew was presented with a dilemma that required the help of television producer John Wells, that was the guest starring of Reeve. Because of the expense of flying Reeve to Vancouver, Beeman and Welling flew to New York City to "bring Smallville to him". This is where Wells lent his hand, as he allowed the Smallville crew to film Reeve's scenes on the set of NBC's Third Watch (1999–2005), similar to how he allowed them to use his West Wing (1999–2006) set for season one's "Hourglass". The decision to go to New York was also made because Reeve used a wheelchair and required much assistance when he traveled. Although James Marshall directed the episode, for Reeve's scenes in New York, the Smallville crew sent Beeman as a stand-in director. Beeman was accompanied by Gough, Welling, and Mat Beck. There was initial concern about Reeve's stamina, as his particular scene with Welling was six pages long, which translates to approximately twelve hours of work day. Beeman tried to design everything so that it was as simple as possible, but Reeve quickly readjusted the scene. Beeman originally had Welling walk into frame and stand in front of Reeve, and then make a single move behind him. Beeman was told, by Reeve, that the scene needed more dynamic between the characters, and if Welling only made a single move then the dynamic would be lost. According to Reeve: "Tom moving around me will hide the fact that I'm unable to move". Beeman's fear of overstretching Reeve's stamina were put to rest when Reeve himself stated that it did not matter how long it took to finish the scene, as long as it turned out great. Reeve filmed all twelve hours in one stretch, and then went on to hold a press conference, as well as a public service announcement following his scenes.

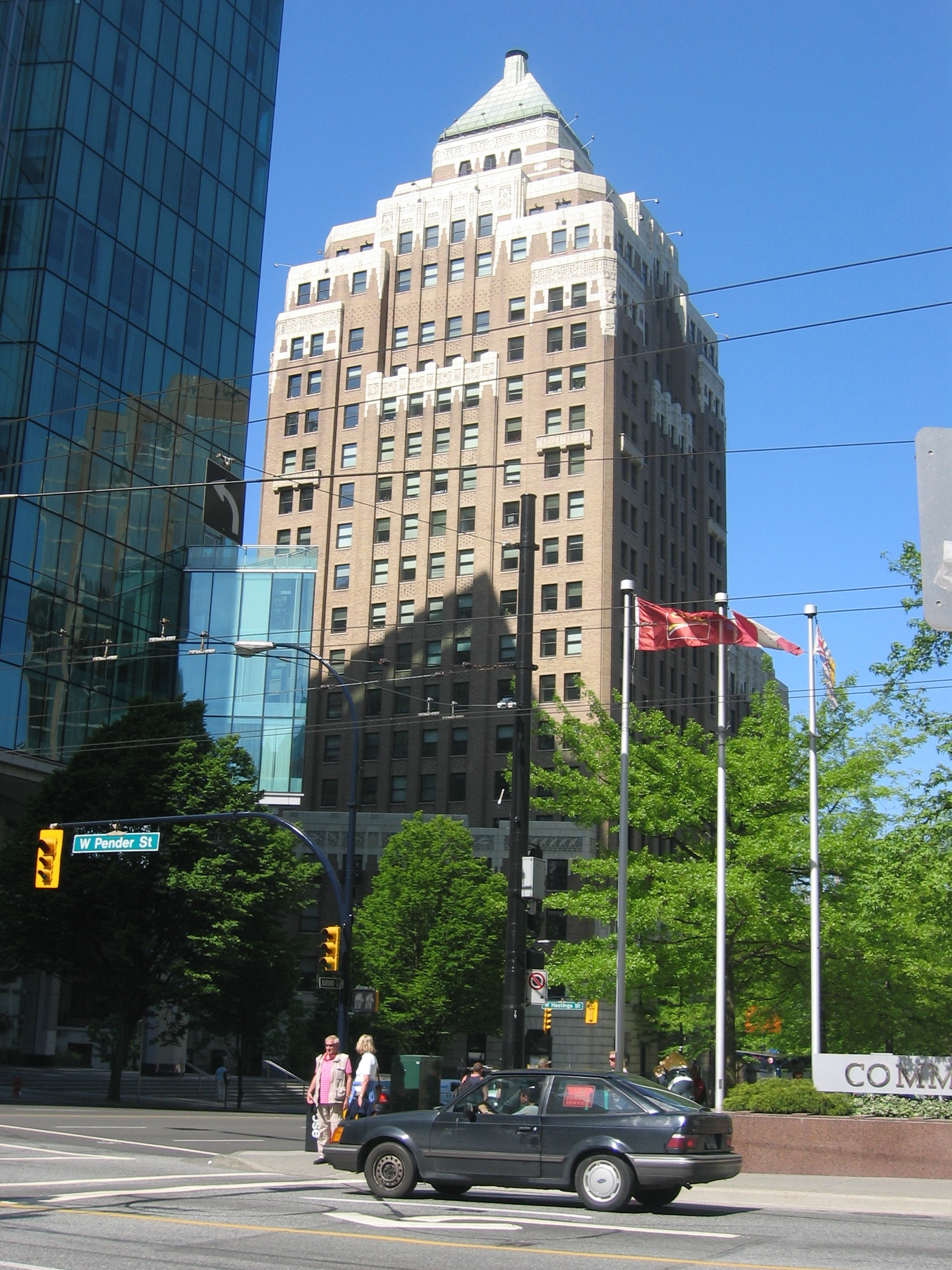
The Vancouver Marine Building had always been Gough and Millar's ideal location to be the series' Daily Planet, which would make its first appearance in season two's "Insurgence".

At times, production designer David Willson has to build entire sets, or props for sets, from scratch instead of finding an available alternative. For "Witness", Willson found an abandoned warehouse to use for the scene where Clark is thrown into a furnace by the three kryptonite-powered thieves. In the warehouse, Willson built a 40-foot-square (12 m), 30-foot-tall (9.1 m) blast furnace. In "Visitor", Willson and his production crew built a "practical, functioning" tower for the scene in the woods where the character Cyrus attempts to call for his alien transport. Willson's inspiration came while working on Love Field (1992). While working on the project, Willson met a man named Bowler Simpson, who had built a 10-acre (40,000 m^{2}) memorial, to his deceased daughter, out of old license plates and STOP signs. Willson used this image when constructing Cyrus's tower. Even though the tower was physically built, Entity FX still stepped in to create 2-D light beams located on the tower. Willson also likes to add elements to his sets that correlate thematically with the episode, like in "Red", where Clark is exposed to red kryptonite. Here, Willson emphasized the "red theme"; working with director Jeff Woolnough, Willson tried to make sure there was something red "popping-out" to catch the audiences' attention in each scene. This would include red objects in the foreground and background, as well as red lenses added to the cameras. Going along with the theme of colors in the show, Metropolis was given a "glass and steel and blue wash of color" for the look of the city. The crew found a new building in Vancouver, which was not yet occupied, and turned it into LuthorCorp plaza. By coincidence, the building sat neighboring the Marine Building, which Gough and Millar had always seen as becoming the Daily Planet building for the series, as the Marine Building held an "art deco structure from the 1930s" they felt embodied what their version of the Daily Planet would look like.

Flashback sequences became an important element in two episodes this season, "Lineage" and "Suspect". Beeman, who directed "Lineage", worked off the same inspiration as Biller, who used John Sayles' Lone Star when writing the flashback sequences for the episode. Beeman tried to visually shift from the present to past without any effects shots; this included changing night to day in the same shot, and removing/inserting actors from shots when they were out of the view of the camera. In his directorial debut, Biller was met with the challenge of creating flashbacks for all the scenes that retold the event of the attack on Lionel. Biller had already seen Beeman's take on flashback scenes from his work on "Lineage", but Biller wanted to do something different. Alongside director of photography Glen Winter, Biller opted to shoot all the flashback sequences on 16 mm color reversal film, which would give the flashbacks a "grainy, dirty look" that Biller thought gave an interesting quality to the flashback scenes.

=== Digital effects ===
A big part of the Smallville series relies on the effects it delivers, whether digital (CGI), physical, or special make-up effects. The effects shots, part of the post-production work, were originally developed and added in Los Angeles. At the start of season two, Entity FX, which is based in Santa Monica, California, became the primary special effects team. One of the first jobs the team had was creating the tornado that would suck up Lana in the season two opener, as well as creating the truck that would disintegrate around her as the winds from the tornado pulled it apart. Beck, the visual effects supervisor, describes the effects used to create the tornado as being similar to the techniques used to create the Balrog in The Lord of the Rings trilogy (2001–2003). For the scene of Lana's truck spinning around in the tornado, Beck used "animated sprites of real smoke that flew around following particles". Visual effects supervisor John Wash filmed debris hanging from a green screen, like loose straw and mailboxes, which he would "swirl around" the stage. The truck was then built on a computer by Jon Han, who created individual pieces—engine block, fenders, and other similar parts—that he would rip off to give the appearance of the truck breaking apart. Welling and Kreuk were filmed with tracking marks, which the computer used to line up the digital truck around them.

Upper: Clark's heat vision begins with a flare up in his iris Lower: Going against the previous "laser vision" looks of heat vision, Gough and Millar chose to use a "heat ripple" effect.

When Entity FX took over the duties of creating the digital effects for the series, they also took over the challenge of crafting effects that would illustrate Clark's super-powered abilities, including the new "heat vision" that was introduced this season. The visual effects for heat vision evolved over the course of the first season, until Gough and Millar agreed on one that reflected their image of what heat vision should look like; they did not want the usual "red beams" or "laser vision". The visuals developed from the idea that they wanted Clark to be able to use it in front of people without them being able to see it. What emerged was a "heat ripple" from "distorting the frame". Wash explained what the creators were looking for:

"[Gough and Millar] wanted to be fairly accurate in terms of what you might see from something that was searingly hot traveling through the air, like a disturbance of the atmosphere. We keyed our research off the little ripples that you see if a light goes past a hotplate and reflects on a wall. We used a computer to create a conical version of that effect that could emanate from Clark's eyes, in combination with a little effect".

They used "blobs of heat vision" instead of "constant rays" for the first instances of Clark using his ability, in an effort to simulate Clark's attempts to control it. A couple of episodes later in "Red", the special effects team would use similar techniques for red kryptonite. To illustrate red kryptonite's effect on Clark, and it releasing his inhibitions, the special effects team crafted digital effects in his eyes. Brian Harding tweaked the effects they were already using for Clark's heat vision, giving them a "little devilish, hellish red flicker" in Clark's iris. To help illustrate Clark's super speed, Beck and his team would slow down and speed up background settings in a single shot. For example, in "Ryan", when Clark speeds up to the camera everything else slows to a stop—leaves stop blowing and birds are frozen in mid-flight—then everything begins moving normally as Clark races away from the camera. Entity FX also adds a blurring effect to Clark's body, as well as a distortion to the background to help further illustrate the speed at which Clark travels.

In "Accelerate", Entity FX was able to create a visual effect of Clark superspeeding through the rain—something Gough and Millar had wanted to see since season one—that eventually won them a Visual Effects Society award. Gough and Millar had always wanted to see Clark superspeeding through a rain shower, but "the opportunity, [and] money" never presented itself, until now. Entity FX had an extended period of time to research the kinetics of the cemetery scene, where Clark would speed through rain drops, because there were limited effects done for the episodes "Precipice" and "Witness". Using HoudiniTM, Beck and his team began creating their digital raindrops: "Each raindrop can be thought of as a lens, as a mirror, and an object in itself. The entire backdrop is refracted through it like a lens, and the area behind the camera is being reflected in it. By adjusting those parameters, we were able to give it a brilliant jewel-like magical quality". When trying to decide on the shape of the raindrops, Beck explained: "We figured that round drops weren't that interesting, and teardrop ones looked a little silly and over the top, so we settled on this round diamond shape". Entity FX created "collision events" as Clark ran through the raindrops, breaking them up. Beck remembered watching the cars on the freeway, during a rainstorm, "throwing up these loose trails of spray". Eli Jarra added a similar mist trail to Clark as he ran through the cemetery to give a more realistic effect, although Beck admits to taking a few liberties with the final look of the mist. Occasionally, Beck and his team have to stretch the limits of the realistic physics they try and create when illustrating Clark's abilities. While creating the alley scene in "Prodigal" where Lucas is attacked by an assassin with an Uzi 9mm, Beck had to "cheat" the realism on the special effects used. First, the length of the alley is exaggerated in order to create enough time to show Clark stopping the bullets from hitting Lucas. Based on the calculations of how fast an Uzi 9 mm fires, and the muzzle velocity, they estimated that the bullets would be approximately twenty to thirty feet apart; four alleys would have been needed for Clark to catch up to all of the bullets in time. Second, the bullets themselves were enlarged so that audiences would be able to see them.

Apart from creating the effects for Clark's powers, Entity FX also has the responsibility of dressing up the backgrounds of location shoots. For instance, in a flashback sequence from "Lineage", where Lionel finds his son in a field of flattened corn, Entity FX had to step in and adjust the scene based on executive producer Ken Horton's request. The script called for "corn flattened as far as the eye could see", but Horton wanted a defined stopping point for all the destruction; a wall of corn was digitally erected surrounding the area of trammeled corn stalks. For the final shot of the season finale, where Clark is on a motorcycle heading toward Metropolis, Entity FX had to remove the forests and mountains that occupy the Vancouver landscape and digitally insert hills, extend the road into the distance and create a digital version of Metropolis in the background. In the episode "Insurgence", during the moment when Clark is about to make his leap from the Daily Planet to LuthorCorp, the camera pans around the Daily Planet globe revealing Metropolis in its reflection before shifting down to the roof as Clark walks out. Entity FX created the image of Metropolis by using a computer to combine CG buildings, matte paintings, and real elements from the Vancouver streets. The company also took over the rest of the visual elements for the shot of Clark's actual leap. After Welling was shot on a green screen performing the leap from the Daily Planet, Entity FX performed their usual slowing and quickening of the timing elements, to give the effect of Clark's speed, as well as added a reflected version of Clark in the LuthorCorp building to illustrate Clark's impending crash through the glass.

Sometimes the cleanup is a last minute job that could not be completed during production. In "Fever", time constraints forced the production team to rely on Entity FX to create the Talon marquee that hangs outside of the building, something that they typically do not do. While filming the shots in Hamilton's lab that involved kryptonite, the special effects team had to go in during post-production for "Duplicity" and make the kryptonite glow, because the material used in production to make the kryptonite glow did not photograph well. A last minute change in the storyline for "Skinwalker" required Entity FX to digitally adjust the opening teaser. In the original scene that was filmed, a wolf watched the aftermath of an explosion at the LuthorCorp construction site. It was decided that the wolf would watch the explosion as it happened, so Entity FX had to go back to the scene and recompose it. Hiding the head of the trainer who was holding onto the wolf, Entity FX digitally corrected the color composition and the lighting around the wolf so that it appears as though the explosion was occurring right in front of the wolf.

"We couldn't track it to the exact action of his hands on the live-action footage. I guess he doesn't have a lot of experience hanging onto a Bell Jet Ranger".
— Mat Beck on tracking Sean Faris' hands for the CGI shots

For the episode "Nocturne", Entity FX ran into a snag when it came time to create the image of the episode's villain grabbing hold of a LuthorCorp helicopter. Beck did not want to "cheat" the audience by using a cut technique to show Byron holding the helicopter; instead, Entity FX used CGI to create an entire helicopter. From there they decided they wanted the helicopter blades to cut-up the hedges. The special effects team tried to track Sean Faris' hands, as he was holding onto a crossbar that represented the helicopter's skid, to find a spot where they could make the helicopter roll toward the hedge. Faris, however, did not move in a manner that they could use, so the effects team created a pair of CGI hands on the skid, and performed the action they needed with the computer model. To create the effect of Ian splitting himself in "Dichotic", Entity FX used three difference techniques. First, the primary shot of a CGI face pushing its way through a digital image of Thomas' back in three dimension; second, the team used "shadowplay", which is a two dimensional shot appearing on a wall as though the audience is seeing Ian's shadow as he splits himself; last, the team applied another two dimensional effect to the final moment of separation, when strands of CGI flesh snap back to each body. Entity FX worked on the scene in "Fever" where the audience follows kryptonite particles down into Martha's lungs. Beck and his team wanted to be as realistic as possible when digitally crafting the anatomy of the lungs, but they also decided to take certain liberties with the structures in order to "make [them] look cool". The camera follows the green kryptonite particles down Martha's throat, until they attack the alveoli, which subsequently begin turning green.

Entity FX illustrated the destruction of Clark's spaceship by crafting the scene to look as if the ship was decaying from the touch of the kryptonite key placed in its slot.

The season finale required numerous computer-generated imagery. At the start of the episode, Jor-El's disembodied voice talks to Clark through the spaceship. For this scene, Entity FX created a completely computer-generated model of the ship, because the ship had to transform into multiple objects as the scene progressed, creating it digitally was the best option. Later in the episode, when Clark refuses to leave Smallville, Jor-El brands him with a Kryptonian tattoo. Brian Harding worked on the tattoo that is placed on Clark's chest, creating an effect based on the idea that it appeared to burn from the inside. For the same scene, Beck and his team had to digitally create a bare chest for Welling's stunt double, who had to wear a shirt to hide the safety harness he was wearing when they dropped him in the moment Clark is released from the ship's hold.

In order to escape his father, Clark decides to use a kryptonite key to destroy his spaceship. When Clark puts the kryptonite key into the spaceship, Beck and his FX team tried to create a "virus/fungus" growth from the key slot to simulate "some sort of fractal decay". Mike McCormick worked specifically on the process of destroying the ship, giving the ship the appearance that it has a "nasty skin infection" that is spreading as if it is caught in the circulatory system. Next, Beck had to tackle the problem of the ship's final destruction. Originally, it was intended to have the ship explode, but no one wanted to have to rebuild the Kent farm. Instead, they settled on a giant EMP wave given off by the ship the moment it is destroyed. Entity FX created a beam of light that shot vertically up from the ship's location and then fell back down expanding into a "ripple that spread across the land". This beam of light would create a crater where the storm cellar was, which was dug prior to filming and digitally covered up so as to keep the illusion. One of the final shots of the episode was of Lex watching as his plane crashed into the ocean. In a homage to Cast Away (2000), Entity FX crafted a digital effect of the ocean water flooding Lex's plane as it hits the ocean. The scene is reminiscent of the same scene in Cast Away where Tom Hanks's character also watches as the ocean water floods his plane as he crash lands in the ocean.

=== Physical effects ===
Sometimes the digital effects are not necessary, even when they are expected. For the scene where Joe Morton suffers a fatal seizure, the crew used an under-crank shooting technique, to speed up the movements of Morton's character, coupled with Morton's own shaking. In "Precipice", Wash assisted the digital effects team when the production crew was filming a scene that was going to involve Clark X-raying a car with a group of teenagers in it. To achieve the effect of Clark X-raying a SUV, Wash had all the actors in the SUV sit on apple boxes to get them at the representative height they would be in the SUV. The actors then went through all the motions they needed in order to "sell the X-ray effect". For season two, Wash added prosthetic veins to Welling's hands, which would move when he moved, to help simulate the kryptonite poisoning his character would undergo. Then, in post-production, Entity FX would add a green hue to them, and digitally hide the prosthetics when Clark was not affected by the kryptonite; in the first season, there were no physical prosthetics and all effects were done digitally.

Apart from digital, the physical effects performed in Smallville are key, especially when dealing with the villains that Clark must fight in each episode. In "Nocturne", Byron is transformed into a monster with superhuman strength. To demonstrate Byron's strength, the stunt team did a fifty-five foot "chuck", where Bryon throws Clark across the front lawn. To accomplish the task they connected a wire to the stunt man's back, so when Bryon hits "Clark" they can use a crane and hydraulic system, positioned one hundred feet in the air, to pull the stunt man. Twenty-five feet into the pull the wire is released and the stunt man flies the rest of the distance to the landing pad. In "Visage", the bone-morphing Tina returns disguised as Whitney. When she learns that Lana wants Clark, she decides to become Clark. The real Clark confronts Tina, which results in a physical fight between the two Clarks. The fight sequence between the two Clarks originally had more choreographed shots, but had to be cut down to five actions, as the fight sequence was pushing twenty minutes. For the scene, Welling performed all of his stunts alongside his usual stunt double, Christopher Sayour, who doubled as the "second Clark" in the sequence. For the actual stunt of leaping from the Daily Planet to the LuthorCorp building, the production team hooked Welling to a "parallelogram" on the studio greenscreen stage, and then filmed him running across a platform and leaping into the air. The parallelogram rig floated him in midair as he went over the building sill and began his downward trajectory. Although Welling did the initial stunt, his stunt double took over the chore of sliding through the glass as it explodes on contact. Welling is not the only actor to perform his own stunts. Kreuk performed her own stunts for the bridge scene in "Dichotic", where she had to hang 500 feet (150 m) above the river. Her willingness to perform her own stunts saved the team money on greenscreen effects, or stunt doubles that would have been used in her place. Though the cost of using a greenscreen was saved, Entity FX still had to digitally remove all the wire harnesses from the scene, which is an effect that goes unnoticed in the final product of the majority of episodes.

The team had two effects with vehicles that did not perform as originally planned. The first, in "Rush", involved a scene where Pete and Chloe intentionally drive their car off a cliff and Clark speeds in to catch it before it hits the ground. To attain the shot of Clark catching Pete's car required the crew to suspend the car from a crane with Sam Jones III and Allison Mack inside the car. The scene was filmed in a rock quarry, as there are not many cliffs in the Vancouver area, with segments of the scene created digitally. The car was then filmed as it was being pulled into the air backwards—the footage was then reverse to give the impression that it was falling. Initially, Mike Walls and his crew tried to pull the car straight up, but it was not working. The movement of the car had to be tweaked to give a sense of reality. In the season finale, Jonathan and Martha crash their truck on their way home after an EMP blast, which Clark caused, sends a shock wave out that downs a telephone pole and their truck hits it. In order to get the Kent truck to roll for the moment where Jonathan and Martha encounter the wave of EMP, two stunt drivers drove the truck toward a collapsed telephone pole, skidding into it. Then, with mannequins in the truck for safety, the effects team wrapped some cables around the truck and launched it off a ratchet to make it roll. This did not go as smoothly as planned the first time, as the telephone pole did not fall when they set off the explosive charge to break it. Since it would be too hard to strap Schneider and O'Toole into the truck while it is upside down, and too dangerous to flip the truck with them already in it, Walls and his team built a rotating truck seat, which allowed them to strap Schneider and O'Toole in, then rotate the seat so that they are upside down and slide that into the overturned truck.

== Tie-in ==
Beginning during this season, Mack's character, Chloe Sullivan, starred in a promotional tie-in series, Smallville: Chloe Chronicles. An internet based mini-episode wrapped up "unfinished business" from the television series. In this first volume, Chloe investigates events which led to the death of Earl Jenkins, who held Chloe and her friends hostage at the LuthorCorp plant in the first-season episode "Jitters". It aired between April 29 and May 20, 2003, and was exclusive to AOL subscribers.

== Reception ==
Ratings for Smallville's second season were up 23% from the same point last year. It also surpassed 7th Heaven as The WB's most popular show. Gough contributes much of the second season's success to the family dynamic between Clark and his parents, whose emotional core provided a large part of the appeal, as was the move away from the overused "freak of the week" story lines. Gough stated that "most of the time (on TV), the kids are smart, the parents are clueless and they never talk to each other. Ours is the antithesis of that. He turns to them and relies on their guidance". Smallville's adjustment proved successful, as the second season averaged 6.3 million viewers, up from 5.9 million viewers in season one. That was also a move to #113 overall in the Nielsen ratings, up from #115 the year before. The season's fourth episode, "Red", the season's seventeenth episode "Rosetta", and the season finale, "Exodus", were selected in The Futon Critic's 50 best episodes of 2002 and 2003, respectively. "Red" placed 9th, while "Rosetta" placed 22nd, and "Exodus" placed 35th.

The season received mostly favorable reviews. IGN's Jeremy Conrad, gave the second season a score of 8.0/10, stating it was "a clear improvement over season [one] ... This season has better pacing, more interesting story arcs, better special effects, and more importantly, better episodes". When referring to Christopher Reeve's guest appearance on the show, the review went as far as calling it "the best [episode] the show has delivered in its current lifespan ... Reeve is the best special guest star yet." Another review called the show "excellent" and called the acting of Welling, Rosenbaum, and Kreuk "phenomenal". Jennifer Contino from Sequential Tart, a comic-book website, observed that the season was more about "the characters and their relationships", rather than the show's reputable "villain-of-the-week" style. She complimented the red kryptonite that the season introduced into the series, saying that it was fun to see heroes turn bad or see the good guy become a little tarnished or confused. In 2009, TV Guide ranked "Rosetta" 81st on its list of the 100 Greatest Episodes.

== Awards ==
The visual effects team was recognized by the Visual Effects Society with a 2004 VES Award for Outstanding Compositing in a Televised Program, Music Video or Commercial, for the work they did on "Accelerate". That same year, they won the Outstanding Matte Painting in a Televised Program, Music Video, or Commercial award for "Insurgence". In the 2003 Teen Choice Awards, Welling and Kreuk were nominated for Choice TV Actor and Actress; Mack and Rosenbaum were both nominated for Choice Sidekick, and the series was nominated for Choice TV – Action/Adventure. In 2004, "Rosetta" was nominated for a Hugo Award for Best Dramatic Presentation, and actress Jodelle Ferland was nominated for a Young Artist Award for her portrayal of Emily Dinsmore in "Accelerate". For the 29th Annual Saturn Awards, Welling and Kreuk received nominations for Best Actor/Actress, Rosenbaum and Glover both received a nomination for Best Supporting Actor, and the second season was nominated for Best Network Television Series. The DVD release won the Saturn Award for Best DVD Television Release.

== Home media release ==
The complete second season of Smallville was released on May 18, 2004, in North America. Additional releases in region 2 and region 4 took place on September 17, 2004, and January 1, 2005, respectively. The DVD box set included various special features, including episode commentary, The Chloe Chronicles, a featurette on the special effects of Smallville, and a documentary on Christopher Reeve's involvement this season. For the 20th anniversary, the complete series was released for the first time on Blu-ray on October 16, 2021. The Blu-ray release marks the first time when season 2 was released in its native high-definition resolution.
