= David Bell (author) =

American author and college professor

David J. Bell
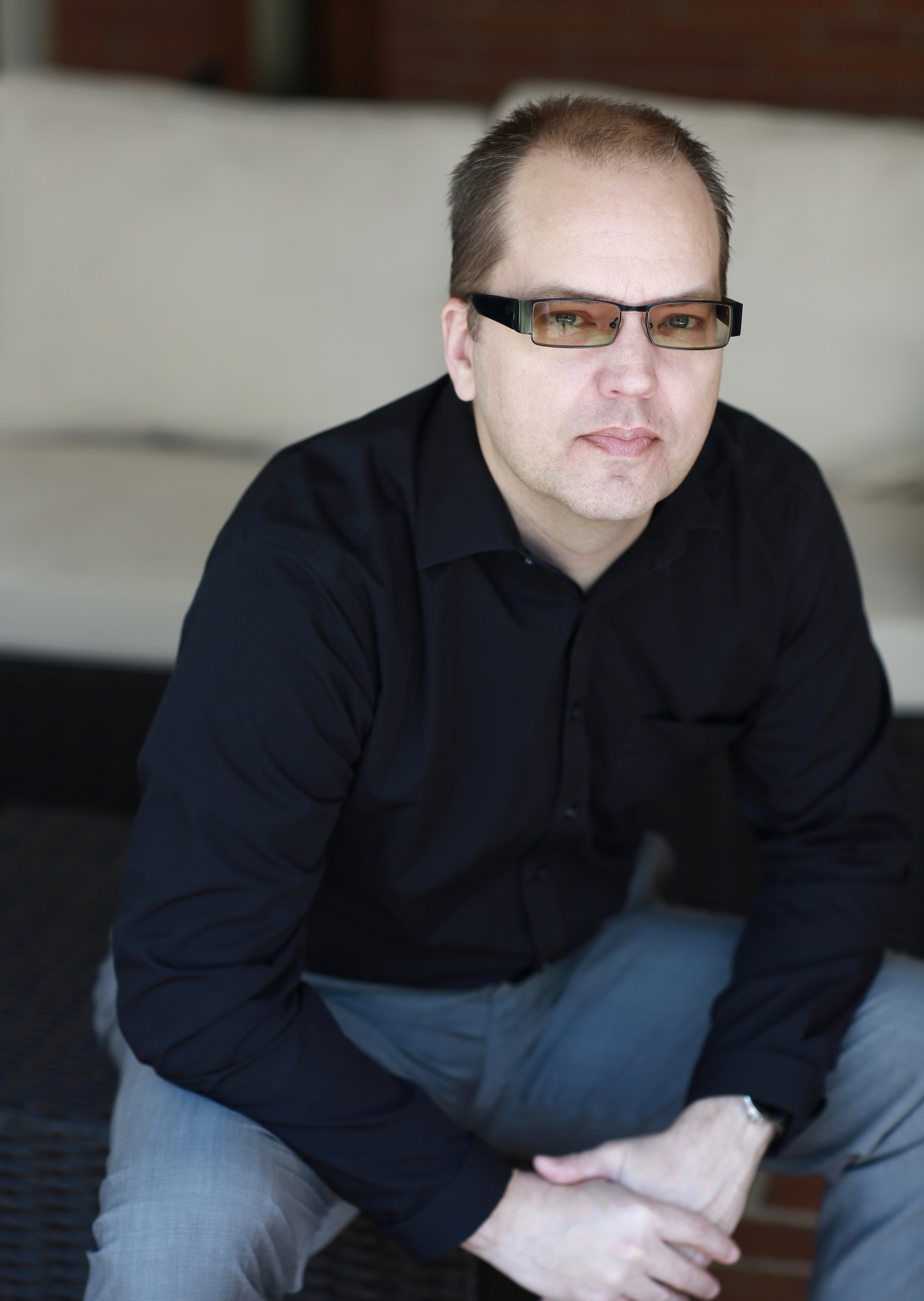
- Bell in 2017
- Born: November 17, 1969 (age 56); Cincinnati, Ohio, U.S.
- Education: St. Xavier High School; Indiana University Bloomington (BA); Miami University (MA); University of Cincinnati (PhD)
- Occupations: Novelist, academic, writing teacher
- Spouse: Molly McCaffrey (m. 1998)
- Writing career
- Genres: Mystery, thriller
- Website: davidbellnovels.com

David J. Bell (born November 17, 1969) is an American writer and university professor of English. He is the author of seventeen novels. His first young adult novel, She's Gone, appeared on the New York Times bestseller list in December of 2022 and January of 2023.

== Education ==
David Bell was born in Cincinnati, Ohio, where he attended St. Catharine of Siena grade school and graduated from St. Xavier High School in 1988. Bell earned his B.A. in English from Indiana University Bloomington, his M.A. in creative writing from Miami University of Ohio, and his Ph.D. in American literature and creative writing from the University of Cincinnati, where he was a Taft Fellow. In 1998, he married author Molly McCaffrey, who writes under the name M Hendrix. They have lived in Bowling Green, Kentucky, since 2008.

== Career ==
Bell began publishing stories in 2002, and they appeared in numerous journals including Cemetery Dance, Rain Crow, Black Petals, The Edge, Shadow Regions, Shock Totem, Western Humanities Review, and Backwards City Review. He has been nominated for the Pushcart Prize five times. His first two novels—The Condemned (2008) and The Girl in the Woods (2009)—were released in hardcover and trade paperback by Delirium Books, under the name David Jack Bell.

Bell's next novel, Cemetery Girl (2011), was released by New American Library, an imprint of Penguin Publishing Group in 2011. Publishers Weekly called Cemetery Girl "disquieting and suspenseful" and Suspense Magazine called it "brilliantly engaging, and a must-read for thriller fans." In 2013, Cemetery Girl was a finalist for the Kentucky Literary Award and won le Prix Polar International de Cognac. The novel also received the most write-in votes when The New York Times asked readers what book should have won the Pulitzer Prize in fiction.

After Cemetery Girl, Penguin Random House published thirteen more of Bell's adult suspense novels with their New American Library and Berkley imprints.

Somebody's Daughter received a Library Journal starred review in 2018, and Kill All Your Darlings was a finalist for an Edgar Award in 2022.

In 2021, Bell signed a three-book contract with Sourcebooks, one of the fastest growing publishers in the world, to write young adult novels for the Sourcebooks Fire imprint. Bell's first young adult suspense novel, She’s Gone, was published in November 2022 and appeared on the New York Times young adult paperback bestseller list in December 2022 and again in January 2023. The teenage characters in She's Gone attended the fictional Garrett Morgan High School, the name of which was inspired by Kentucky inventor Garrett Morgan.

Bell's novels have been translated into numerous languages and included on The New York Times, USA Today, IndieBound, Amazon, Publishers Weekly, and Parnassus Books bestseller lists, as well as being featured as one of Target's Emerging Authors. He also wrote Rides a Stranger, a novella published by Mysterious Press in November 2013.

Bell co-edited two anthologies of short fiction with Molly McCaffrey: Commutability: Stories about the Journey from Here to There (2010) and Stuck in the Middle: Writing That Holds You in Suspense (2016), featuring work by a group of diverse writers including Sarah Domet, Kelcey Ervick, Ed Gorman, Ariana-Sophia Kartsonis, Thomas F. Monteleone, Faye Moskowitz, Norman Prentiss, James Reiss, and Sandra Scofield with cover art by award-winning painter C. David Jones. Both anthologies were published by Main Street Rag publishing.

In addition to his career as a novelist, Bell's essays have appeared in The Wall Street Journal and Crime Reads. He is also a professor of English at Western Kentucky University in Bowling Green, Kentucky, where he co-founded the M.F.A. program in creative writing. He previously taught at Miami University in Ohio and St. Andrews University in Laurinburg, North Carolina.

== Books ==
Novels

- The Condemned (2008), as David Jack Bell
- The Girl in the Woods (2009), as David Jack Bell
- Cemetery Girl (2011)
- The Hiding Place (2012)
- Never Come Back (2013)
- The Forgotten Girl (2014)
- Somebody I Used to Know (2015)
- Since She Went Away (2016)
- Bring Her Home (2017)
- Somebody's Daughter (2018)
- Layover (2019)
- The Request (2020)
- Kill All Your Darlings (2021)
- The Finalists (2022)
- She’s Gone (2022)
- Try Not to Breathe (2023)
- Storm Warning (2024)

Novella

- Rides a Stranger (2013)

Anthologies co-edited with Molly McCaffrey:

- Commutability: Stories About the Journey from Here to There (2010), as David Jack Bell
- Stuck in the Middle: Writing That Holds You in Suspense (2016)
