= Hypertext Magazine =

Social justice magazine based in Chicago, Illinois

- Categories: short fiction, essays, novel excerpts, interviews
- Frequency: print published bi-annually, online published on a rolling basis
- Founder: Christine Maul Rice
- Founded: 2010
- Country: United States
- Language: English
- Website: https://www.hypertextmag.com

Hypertext Magazine is an independent, non-profit social justice literary magazine headquartered in Chicago, Illinois. Founded in 2010 by editor-in-chief Christine Maul Rice, the magazine publishes bi-annually with print and online editions. Subscriptions are free.

In 2018, Hypertext Magazine received a "Gold Star Seal of Transparency" award from non-profit information service GuideStar.

== History ==
The magazine was founded online in 2010 after freelance writer Christine Maul Rice attended the 2008 Story Week editorial panel at Columbia College.

Hypertext Magazine expanded from solely an online literary magazine to bi-annual print magazine in 2017. After seven years of online distribution of content, the first print journal was published in 2017, with an intention of publishing two editions per year.

In addition to a bi-annual print magazine, Rice also launched Hypertext Magazine & Studio in 2017. Hypertext Studio accepts donations from readers.

Notable writers published in Hypertext include Christine Sneed, Jillian Lauren, and Joe Meno. As of 2023, the magazine has an open-submission policy.

The magazine has published up to 600 fiction short stories, essays, interviews, graphic comics, novel excerpts and pieces of poetry, according to Rice. Content is divided into four areas: essays, fiction, interviews, and culture. Editors are unpaid; writers are paid upon publication.

== Print edition ==
In addition to producing online content on a rolling basis, Hypertext has a print journal which features established and emerging writers. Print editions have featured writing from Ron Burch, Marcia Aldrich, Elle Nash, Christine Sneed, and Eileen Favorite.

== Hypertext Studio ==
In October 2017, Rice founded Hypertext Studio, which holds writing workshops in Chicago. The Studio prioritizes writers from marginalized and underserved communities.

== Staff and contributors ==
- Editor: Christine Maul Rice
- Managing editor & fiction editor: Chelsea Laine Wells
- Copyeditor: Linda Naslund
- Senior editors: Karen Halvorsen Schreck, Brian Schlender, and Noelle Aleksandra Hufnagel
- Contributing editor: Sarah Mulroe

== Annual short story & essay contest ==
In 2019, Hypertext Review started a short story and essay contest. Winners in each genre are awarded $100.

Writers that have been published in previous Hypertext Reviews include Tara Betts and Christine Sneed.
