= Flu Bird Horror =

- Flu Bird DVD cover
- Written by: Tony Daniel; Brian D. Smith
- Directed by: Leigh Scott
- Starring: Clare Carey; Lance Guest; Rebekah Kochan
- Theme music composer: Alan Howarth
- Country of origin: United States
- Original language: English

Production
- Producers: Wilfred Ackermann; Kenneth M. Badish
- Cinematography: Gabriel Kosuth
- Editor: Christopher Roth
- Running time: 89 minutes
- Production companies: The Sci-Fi Channel; Castel Film Romania; Active Entertainment; Nu Image Films

Original release
- Network: Sci Fi Channel
- Release: August 23, 2008

Flu Bird Horror is a 2008 television horror Sci Fi Pictures original film written by Tony Daniel and Brian D. Smith, and directed by Leigh Scott. It first aired on The Sci-Fi Channel on August 23, 2008, and was released to DVD as Flu Birds on September 30, 2008. The film's reviews were negative to mixed. Reviewers note the film as being representative of low-budget films being created for and airing on the Sci-Fi Channel.

== Plot ==
Six teenagers on a chaperoned rehabilitation camping trip find themselves being hunted by mutant giant birds infected with a mysterious virus that changes the birds into deadly predators.

Porky is the first to be injured by the birds. Counselor Guy gets killed by birds. The teens devise a plan to escape, with Johnson proclaiming himself leader. When the teens flee to a dangerous military bunker, the birds follow. Derrick takes Johnson's gun. Johnson accidentally pushes Derrick's hand, accidentally killing Hank. Eva finds a walkie talkie and gets in contact with park ranger Garrett (Lance Guest), asking for rescue. The group has no choice but to flee the fort as Porky is eaten alive. Garrett and Jacqueline head out to save the teenagers. A group of scientists and cops get killed while trying to destroy the birds. A nurse also gets infected and tries to leave the hospital; Security has no choice but to kill ker.

After fleeing successfully, Derrick is attacked by a bird, but escapes. The group continues north and discovers a house. They check the nearby shed, which is a meat locker.

Derrick's infection begins ravaging his body and Johnson plans to shoot him because he's a liability. When Derrick jumps onto Johnson, Derrick's saliva falls into Johnson's mouth. Garret and Jacqueline pinpoint the teens' location, but can't reach them because the birds are outside. The group makes a run for the meat shed. Lola and Eva throw out some meat to catch the birds' attention but the birds aren't taking it; they like fresh meat. Derrick hobbles out and offers himself as bait to the birds. They attack and eat him alive. The group finally meets Garrett and Jacqueline and they load into the car. The birds attack the car. Garrett loses control, flipping the car over. Everyone takes shelter under a concrete tunnel. They return to the military bunker, which is leaking gas. A giant bird attacks the police helicopter, which crashes and explodes. A plan is made to destroy the birds using explosives. Johnson volunteers to be the bait to lure the birds in, since he had already been infected by Derrick. As they all flee, Eva pauses, looking back sadly at Johnson. He says he'll make it, but the birds block his escape route. He shoots the explosive, sending the building into flames. The group leaves, remembering Johnson.

== Cast ==
- Clare Carey as Dr. Jacqueline Hale
- Rebekah Kochan as Lola
- Lance Guest as Garrett
- Jonathon Trent as Johnson
- Sarah Butler as Eva
- Bill Posley as Derrick
- Brent Lydic as Gordon
- Tarri Markell as Dr. Giovanna Thomas
- Serban Celea as Oscar Drake
- Gabriel Costin as James "Porky"
- Calin Stanciu as Hank
- Bart Sidles as The Counselor (Barton Slides)

== Reception ==
Blog Critics poked fun at Sci-Fi Channel movies in their review of the film when they wrote "the mutated strain of bird flu started because of mysterious mutant birds in that forest where all Sci-Fi Channel movies are filmed." They made note of a stereotyped cast, poor dialog, and several flaws: "Sluggish pacing, downtime, countless continuity errors, and repetitive dialogue are to be expected for a movie shot with something that can’t even be considered a budget, but Flu Bird Horror takes this to the extreme". Dread Central felt that the story concept was more plausible than that of ABC's 2006 airing of Fatal Contact: Bird Flu in America, but noted that the virus aspect as used in the film made little sense, writing "everything wrong with the film can be traced back to the nonsensical script." They opined that the birds themselves were the stars of the film when they wrote "Those zombie buzzards are the true stars of Flu Bird Horror — both ghastly and goofy all at the same time". While noting that casting was not optimum, they wrote "On the plus side, I can't complain about the acting. I can complain about the dialogue, but I can't complain about the actors themselves." In consideration of the film's weaknesses, they still found it worthwhile by their writing "almost miraculously, Flu Bird Horror remains fairly watchable and I honestly don't know how Scott and company pulled it off all things considered". Monsters & Critics panned the acting, writing that it "ranges from horrible to maniacally over-the-top." However, they granted the film was somewhat better than most bad horror films even though representative of what is being expected from the Sci-Fi Channel by writing "Flu Birds is potentially some "nature on the rampage" goofball fun and a lot better than Ghouls, but it's still not a quality film. Not that you'd be expecting one with Sci-Fi Channel emblazoned on the front". DVD Talk panned the film as "fairly bottom-of-the-barrel stuff, even by creature feature standards", concluding that the "characters are completely uninteresting and the ending is underwhelming and disappointing".
