= Before the Sun Explodes =

2016 film directed by Debra Eisenstadt

- Film poster
- Directed by: Debra Eisenstadt
- Written by: Debra Eisenstadt; Zeke Farrow
- Produced by: Debra Eisenstadt; Zeke Farrow; Cosmos Kiindarius
- Starring: Sarah Butler; Christine Woods; Amir Arison
- Cinematography: Sean Webley
- Edited by: Debra Eisenstadt
- Music by: Mel Elias; J. Chris Newberg
- Release dates: March 14, 2016 (South by Southwest); September 29, 2017 (United States)
- Running time: 80 minutes
- Country: United States
- Language: English

Before the Sun Explodes is a 2016 American drama film directed by Debra Eisenstadt and featuring Sarah Butler, Christine Woods and Amir Arison.

== Cast ==
- Bill Dawes as Ken
- Sarah Butler as Holly
- Christine Woods as Diana
- Michael Rivkin as Zeb
- Amir Arison as Chip
- Max Morgen as Michael
- Jasper Morgen as Joe

== Critical reception ==
Writing in The Los Angeles Times, Gary Goldstein described the film as "intimate, if at times stagy," and noted that "questions are opaquely answered — or not — over the course [...] with this smart, intriguing film ending perhaps too soon for more inquiring minds." A review of the film in The Austin Chronicle described it as "between 'manic pixie dream girl' romantic comedy and stalker thriller," that it "never quite works by the conventions of either genre, but it does display a sharp eye for the rootless edges of the L.A. showbiz world, where everyone is some variety of creepy weirdo," and that it "resists any sort of conclusive ending."
