= Nightmare Nurse =

2016 American TV movie

- Promotional poster
- Written by: Jake Helgren
- Directed by: Craig Moss
- Starring: Sarah Butler; Steven Good; Lindsay Hartley; Traci Lords
- Music by: David Findlay
- Country of origin: United States
- Original language: English

Production
- Producers: Stan Spry; Eric Scott Woods; Fernando Szew
- Cinematography: Ben Demaree
- Editor: Jon Tatum
- Running time: 84 minutes

Original release
- Network: Lifetime
- Release: March 5, 2016

Nightmare Nurse is a 2016 American crime thriller television film directed by Craig Moss. It stars Sarah Butler, Steven Good, Lindsay Hartley, and Traci Lords. The film premiered on March 5, 2016, on Lifetime Television.

== Plot ==
A young couple, Brooke and Lance, are injured in a car accident. At the hospital, Brooke is awakened by a nurse named Barb who informs her that Lance has been seriously injured and is in surgery. Not being able to remember everything that happened, Brooke eventually tells them that she remembers a man crossing the road in front of them just before they hit him, which is strange since Brooke and Lance are the only people who were transported to the hospital. With Lance's upcoming release, it's important that Brooke finds a competent nurse who can look after him while she works. Lance is left to be cared for by an attractive nurse Chloe. However, his health begins to decline after he is administered several doses of Oxycontin, leading Brooke to wonder if his nurse is harming him. Her suspicions are confirmed when a phone call from a stranger brings Chloe's troubled past to light. Soon, they discover that one of the hospital nurses is out to exact revenge.

== Cast ==
- Sarah Butler as Brooke
- Steven Good as Lance
- Lindsay Hartley as Chloe
- Traci Lords as Barb
- René Ashton as Gwen
- Michael Finn as Paul
- Jessica Morris as Connie
- Nate Scholz as James
- David Starzyk as Detective Thames
- Julian Stone as Marco

== Production ==
=== Casting ===
Lindsay Hartley was cast without auditioning for the part. "I did not audition for this one. My agent called me over a weekend, and said they made an offer for me to play this part in this movie. They wanted me to read the script in like two hours and get back to them since they started shooting on Tuesday. So, I really quickly read the script and thought it was fantastic, and I loved it. It kind of reminded me of Theresa from Passions having a bad day!"

== Release ==
=== Critical reception ===
Inquisitr compared the film to another Lifetime television film Widow on the Hill (2005), which was said to be based on a true story of Donna Somerville, a nurse who was accused of killing her patient, and eventual husband.
