= All Light Will End =

- Release poster
- Directed by: Chris Blake
- Written by: Chris Blake; Jason Hill
- Produced by: Dave Moody; Kelly L. Frey; Chris Blake; Josh Moody; Waylen Thomas Hardy
- Starring: Ashley Pereira; Alexandra Harris; Sam Jones III; Sarah Butler; Andy Buckley; John Schuck; Ted Welch; Michael James Thomas; Katie Garfield; Graham Outerbridge; Aaron Munoz
- Cinematography: Josh Moody
- Edited by: Josh Moody; Chris Blake
- Music by: Waylen Thomas Hardy
- Production companies: Red Vessel Entertainment; Downbeat Films
- Distributed by: Gravitas Ventures
- Release date: November 6, 2018 (Blu-ray/DVD)
- Running time: 85 minutes
- Country: United States
- Language: English

All Light Will End is a 2018 American thriller film written and directed by Chris Blake, in his feature-length directorial debut, starring Ashley Pereira, Sam Jones III, Sarah Butler, John Schuck, and Andy Buckley.

== Premise ==
Young, successful horror novelist Savannah Martin's (Ashley Pereira) new book is taking the genre by storm. Her father (Andy Buckley), the police chief of her small hometown in Cheatham County, Tennessee, investigates murders and foul play too grim for their bucolic life. As she and her friends settle in for a relaxing weekend at her childhood home, the dark secret at the crux of Savannah's success stirs in her dreams and seeps into her reality. Amidst sexual tensions and fireside stories, Savannah's despondency and her father's case collide with gruesome and horrifying reveals, leaving little distinction between the subconscious and reality.

== Cast ==
- Ashley Pereira as Savannah
- Alexandra Harris as Faith
- Sam Jones III as Adam
- Sarah Butler as Diana
- Andy Buckley as Chief David
- John Schuck as The Psychiatrist
- Ted Welch as Jack
- Graham Outerbridge as Paul
- Michael James Thomas as Leeland
- Katie Garfield as Kelly Rae
- Rich Redmond as Chris Issac
- Aaron Munoz as Stache
- Briana Tedesco as Young Savannah
- Iain Tucker as The Lineman Brothers
- Bill Billions as Bill

== Production ==
The film was shot on location in various areas of Nashville, Tennessee.

== Release ==
The film premiered on March 24, 2018, at the HorrorHound Film Festival in Cincinnati, Ohio, then held its Canadian premiere at the Toronto International Spring of Horror on April 8, 2018. It was announced that the film would also screen at the Tupelo Film Festival on April 19 and April 21, 2018, as well as the International Horror Hotel Film Festival in June. The film was acquired for distribution by Gravitas Ventures and is set for release in November 2018.

== Awards ==
- Best Original Screenplay, Toronto International Spring of Horror (2018)
- Best Feature Film, Tupelo Film Festival (2018)
- 2nd Place for Suspense-Thriller, International Horror Hotel Film Festival (2018)
