= Hiding =

Hiding is obscuring something from view or rendering it inconspicuous. It may refer to:

- Hiding (programming), of inherited methods in object-oriented computer programming
- Hiding (TV series), a 2015 Australian television series
- "Hiding" (Watching), a 1987 television episode
- Christoffer Hiding (born 1985), a Swedish singer
- Information hiding, in computer science, the hiding of design decisions in a computer program

== See also ==
- Hiding in Plain Sight (disambiguation)
- Hiding Place (disambiguation)
- Hide (disambiguation)
- Hide and Seek (disambiguation)
