= Free Fall (2014 American film) =

Direct-to-video crime thriller film

- Film poster
- Directed by: Malek Akkad
- Written by: Dwayne Alexander Smith
- Produced by: Malek Akkad; Abhishek Devalla; Louis Nader; Warren Zide
- Starring: Sarah Butler; Malcolm McDowell; D. B. Sweeney
- Production companies: Trancas International Films; Stuck Film Group
- Distributed by: Anchor Bay Films
- Release date: October 17, 2014
- Running time: 91 minutes
- Country: United States
- Budget: $1.5 million

Free Fall is a 2014 American direct-to-video crime thriller film directed by Malek Akkad in his feature debut and starring Sarah Butler, Malcolm McDowell and D. B. Sweeney. It follows an employee followed by an assassin and locked in an elevator.

== Plot ==
When the sudden and shocking death of a coworker sends everyone reeling at Gault Capital, Jane Porter (Sarah Butler), uncovers a very dangerous secret. Her boss, charismatic billionaire Thaddeus Gault (Malcolm McDowell), is suspected of massive financial fraud. An assassin, Frank (D.B. Sweeney), is dispatched to silence her forever. Jane's flight from the office is forestalled when her pursuer shuts down her elevator. Now, trapped and alone, Jane must find a way to escape her steel cage before the killer reaches her. This brooding and relentless thriller plunges our heroine, Jane, into a free fall of betrayal and terror. To survive Jane must find the inner strength and courage to defeat the powers that hold her and her dreams captive by fear.

== Cast ==
- D. B. Sweeney as Frank
- Sarah Butler as Jane Porter
- Malcolm McDowell as Thaddeus Gault
- Ian Gomez as Ronald Taft
- Adam Tomei as Robert
- Mustafa Speaks as Lamont
- Thea Rubley as Colleen
- Jayson Blair as Ray
- Kristina Klebe as Pam
- Bill Leaman as Mike
- Annie Tedesco as Helen
- Justin Beahm as Background
