= Cemetery Girl =

Book by David Bell

- Author: David Bell
- Language: English
- Publisher: New American Library
- Publication date: October 4, 2011
- Publication place: United States
- Media type: Print (paperback) and ebook
- Pages: 392
- ISBN: 0451234677

Cemetery Girl is a novel by American writer David Bell, which was released by New American Library, a member of Penguin Group USA in 2011.

== Novel ==
The novel tells the story of Tom and Abby Stuart, a couple who had everything: a perfect marriage, successful careers, and a beautiful twelve-year-old daughter, Caitlin. Then one day Caitlin vanished without a trace. For a while they grasped at every false hope and followed every empty lead, but the tragedy ended up changing their lives, overwhelming them with guilt and dread, and shattering their marriage.

Four years later, Caitlin is found alive—dirty and disheveled yet preternaturally calm. She won’t discuss where she was or what happened. Then the police arrest a suspect connected to the disappearance, but Caitlin refuses to testify, leaving the Stuarts with a choice: let the man who may be responsible for destroying their lives walk away, or take matters into their own hands. And when Tom decides to try to uncover the truth for himself, he finds that nothing that has happened yet can prepare him for what he is about to discover.

== Reception ==
Publishers Weekly called Cemetery Girl “disquieting and suspenseful” and Suspense Magazine called it “brilliantly engaging, and a must-read for thriller fans.” The Washington Post criticized Bell's novel because "his characters keep behaving in maddeningly irrational ways."

Cemetery Girl won the prestigious Prix Polar International de Cognac in 2013 and was a finalist for the 2012 Kentucky Literary Award.

The novel also received the most write-in votes when The New York Times asked readers what book should have won the Pulitzer Prize in fiction.

== Cemetery Girl book trailer ==
Nashville filmmaker James Weems shot a short film called “Caitlin’s Story” that serves as the book trailer for Bell’s Cemetery Girl.
