= Willie Worsley =

American basketball player (born 1945)

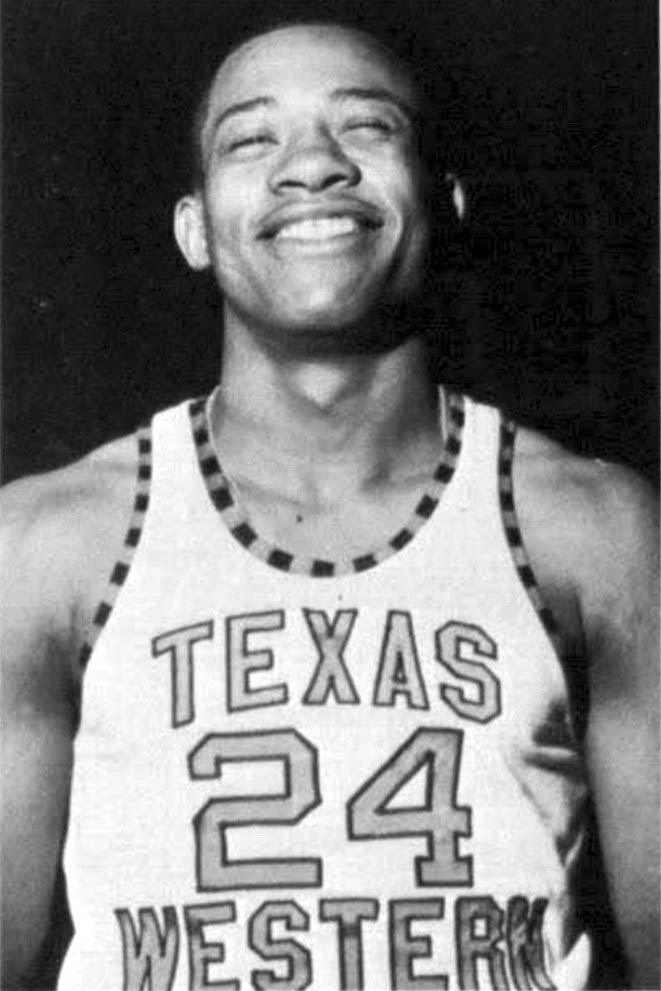
- Worsley in 1966

Personal information
- Born: November 13, 1945 (age 80) Bronx, New York, U.S.
- Listed height: 5 ft 6 in (1.68 m)
- Listed weight: 175 lb (79 kg)

Career information
- High school: DeWitt Clinton (Bronx, New York)
- College: UTEP (1965–1968)
- NBA draft: 1966: undrafted
- Position: Point guard
- Number: 33

Career history
- 1968–1969: New York Nets

Career highlights
- NCAA champion (1966)
- Stats at Basketball Reference

Willie James Worsley (born November 13, 1945) is an American former professional basketball player who was one of the guards for the Texas Western Miners basketball team during their now-legendary 1966 NCAA championship game against Kentucky. Although only 5 foot 6 inches tall, he later played 24 games for the ABA's New York Nets during the 1968–69 season after being drafted by the Dallas Chaparrals in the 1968 ABA draft.

Willie played basketball for DeWitt Clinton High School in the Bronx, leading the team to a New York City Championship in 1963. Playing before a crowded Madison Square Garden, he was named the championships MVP that year. The team also enjoyed a 38-game winning streak during his playing days. NBA great, Nate "Tiny" Archibald, two years his junior, always looked up to Willie at DeWitt Clinton and eventually joined him in the backcourt at Texas El Paso (Texas Western) for the 1967–1968 season.

Remembering the Kentucky victory, Willie said he enjoyed the game for another reason: His working mother was home in front of a TV, watching. "It was the only time my mother, Julia, got to see me play. She'd never seen me play at all," he said.

Toward the end of the 1960s, Worsley took over as coach for the now-defunct children's shelter Woodycrest located in High Bridge, The Bronx, New York City. There, in conjunction with James Neal, he oversaw the shelter's athletic programs. By the end of the 1970s, the shelter had merged with another home located in Pomona, New York and Worsley had become a director. After this organization became bankrupt, Worsley became coach of the Spring Valley High School boys' basketball team in Rockland County, New York.

While continuing to coach the Spring Valley High School basketball team, Worsley became the Boys Choir of Harlem's Dean of Students.

In the 2006 film Glory Road about the 1966 championship team, Worsley was portrayed by Sam Jones III.
