= Hiding Place =

The Hiding Place or Hiding Place may refer to:

== Film ==
- The Hiding Place (Playhouse 90), a 1960 episode of American TV series; based on Robert Shaw's 1959 novel
- The Hiding Place (film), a 1975 American drama based on the 1971 book by Corrie ten Boom
- The Hiding Place, a 2000 American drama starring Kim Hunter and Timothy Bottoms, from the play by Mitch Giannunzio
- The Hiding Place, a 2008 American drama by Jeff Whitty

== Literature ==
- The Hiding Place, 1959 British novel by Robert Shaw
- The Hiding Place (biography), 1971 memoir by Corrie ten Boom, who hid Dutch Jews during WWII
- Hiding Place (Wideman novel), 1981 middle volume of "Homewood Trilogy" by American John Edgar Wideman
- The Hiding Place (Azzopardi novel), 2000 Welsh Booker Prize shortlist
- The Hiding Place (Bell novel), 2012 American mystery

== Music ==
- Hiding Place (band), Scottish rock band, active from 2004 to 2007
- Hiding Place (Selah album), 2004
- Hiding Place, a 2006 album by Don Moen
- Hiding Place (Tori Kelly album), 2018

== See also ==
- No Hiding Place, 1959–1967 British police detective TV series
- Hiding Places, 2019 American album by Billy Woods
