= Debra Eisenstadt =

American film director

Debra Eisenstadt (born July 23, 1969) is an American writer, director, producer and editor.

== Career ==
Eisenstadt began her career as an actress, most notably starring in the theater and film versions of David Mamet’s Oleanna opposite William H. Macy. Eisenstadt wrote, produced, directed, shot and edited the feature film Daydream Believer, winner of an Independent Spirit Award and The Grand Jury Prize at the Slamdance Film Festival. She helmed the award-winning films The Limbo Room (with Melissa Leo, Peter Dinklage), Before the Sun Explodes which premiered in competition at SXSW Film Festival, and Blush starring Wendi McLendon-Covey. Eisenstadt Executive Produced the Grammy award-winning documentary Moonage Daydream which premiered at The Cannes Film Festival (2022), Kurt Cobain: Montage of Heck, Sundance (2015) and Jane, the Emmy award-winning documentary about Jane Goodall (2017). Eisenstadt is an Academy Nicholl finalist.

Eisenstadt wrote and directed the 2019 film Imaginary Order which premiered in competition at the 2019 Sundance Film Festival.

== Personal life ==
Eisenstadt is married to director Brett Morgen. She is the mother of Sky, Max & Jasper. BA from Bennington College in 1991, MA in Film/Media Studies from New School University in 2001.
