= Sam Jones III =

American actor (born 1983)

- Born: Samuel L. Jones III; April 29, 1983 (age 43); Boston, Massachusetts, U.S.
- Other name: King Sam Jones III
- Occupation: Actor
- Years active: 1999–present

Samuel L. Jones III (born April 29, 1983) is an American actor. He is best known for playing Pete Ross on the first three seasons (2001-2003) of the Superman television series Smallville, Willie Worsley in the 2006 film Glory Road, Craig Shilo on Blue Mountain State, Chaz Pratt on ER and Billy Marsh in the 2006 film Home of the Brave.

== Career ==
In his early acting career, Sam Jones III played Pete Ross on the first three seasons of the television series Smallville, based on the early years of Superman, after which he left before season 3's final episode "Covenant", but returned in the season 7 episode "Hero". Jones has also appeared on the television shows The Practice, ER, CSI: Crime Scene Investigation and 7th Heaven. He appeared with actress Raven-Symoné in the 2006 Lifetime movie For One Night. Jones also played Craig Shilo in Spike TV's Blue Mountain State and reprised his role in the 2016 film Blue Mountain State: The Rise of Thadland. In 2014, Jones completed filming the movie Of Fortune and Gold. In 2018, he joined the cast of writer/director Chris Blake's indie horror film, All Light Will End, alongside Andy Buckley and John Schuck.

== Personal life ==
In 2010, a sex tape leaked with Jones' then model girlfriend Karissa Shannon. It was reported that the pair initially tried to block the release of the sex tape, but after striking a deal, the tape was released on DVD by Vivid Entertainment called Karissa Shannon Superstar. In 2011, Jones and Shannon, as the duo KAM3, released a song entitled "Juice and Vodka"; once available on iTunes, it is currently available on TMZ.

== Legal issues ==
Jones was convicted of conspiracy to possess illegal drugs with the intent to distribute. The incident was part of a DEA sting operation. On December 16, 2010, Jones pled guilty to conspiracy and on June 22, 2011, Jones was sentenced to 366 days in federal prison and three years' probation. On December 6, 2011, Jones began serving his sentence at the Lompoc Correctional Complex in California. He was released on October 12, 2012, after serving 10 months. He has since returned to acting.

== Filmography ==
Film
Year	Title	Role	Notes
2001	Snipes	Erik	
2002	ZigZag	Louis "ZigZag" Fletcher	
2006	Glory Road	Willie Worsley	
2006	For One Night	Brandon Williams	Television film
2006	Home of the Brave	Billy Marsh	
2009	Safe Harbor	Billy	Television film
2010	Krews	Wishbone	
2015	Of Fortune and Gold	Phil	
2016	Blue Mountain State: The Rise of Thadland	Craig Shilo	
2016	Diagnosis Delicious	Luke	Television film
2018	All Light Will End	Adam	

Television
Year	Title	Role	Notes
1999	NYPD Blue	Jerome Banks	Episode: "I Have a Dream"
1999	The Parent 'Hood	Wedding Guest	Episode: "Wedding Bells Blues" (uncredited)
1999	Saved by the Bell: The New Class	Jeff	Episode: "Show Me the Money"
1999	Pensacola: Wings of Gold	Earvin "Magic" Schneider	Episode: "Gypsy Tumble"
1999	Judging Amy	Robert Chetwind	Episode: "Near Death Experience"
2000	Pacific Blue	Ricky Davis	Episode: "A Thousand Words"
2000–2001	CSI: Crime Scene Investigation	James Moore	Episodes: "Crate 'n' Burial", "Evaluation Day"
2001–2004, 2008	Smallville	Pete Ross	Main role (seasons 1–3); guest (season 7)
2002	The Nightmare Room	Russell	Episodes: "Camp Nowhere: Part 1", "Camp Nowhere: Part 2"
2003	The Practice	Troy Ezekiel	Episode: "Capitol Crimes"
2004	Smallville: Chloe Chronicles	Pete Ross	4 episodes
2005–2009	ER	Charlie "Chaz" Pratt Jr.	Recurring (seasons 11–15)
2006	7th Heaven	Alex	Episode: "Got MLK?"
2007	Bones	Tyler Neville	Episode: "Intern in the Incinerator"
2008	Army Wives	Jake	Episode: "Mothers & Wives"
2010	Blue Mountain State	Craig Shilo	Main role (season 1)
2010	The Defenders	Mason	Episode: "Nevada v. Carter"
