= John Schuck =

American actor (b. 1940)

- Schuck in Holmes & Yoyo, 1977
- Born: Conrad John Schuck Jr. February 4, 1940 (age 86); Boston, Massachusetts, U.S
- Occupation: Actor
- Years active: 1969–present
- Spouses: Susan Bay (m. 1978; div. 1983); Harrison Houlé (m. 1990)
- Children: Aaron Bay-Schuck

Conrad John Schuck Jr. (born February 4, 1940) is an American film, stage, and television actor. He is best known for his role as Sergeant Charles Enright in the 1970s crime drama McMillan & Wife. He also played Herman Munster in the late-1980s – early 1990s sitcom The Munsters Today, playing the role originated by Fred Gwynne in the 1960s sitcom The Munsters.

Schuck is also known for his work on Star Trek, often playing Klingon characters, as well as his recurring roles as Draal on Babylon 5 and as Chief of Detectives Muldrew of the New York City Police Department in Law & Order.

== Life and career ==
Schuck was born in Boston, Massachusetts, to Mary (née Hamilton) and Conrad John Schuck, a professor at SUNY Buffalo. He is of English and German descent.

He made his first theatrical appearances at Denison University, and after graduating continued his career at the Cleveland Play House, Baltimore's Center Stage, and finally the American Conservatory Theater, where he was discovered by Robert Altman.

Schuck made TV appearances in 1969 on episodes of NET Playhouse and Gunsmoke, as well as Mission Impossible in 1970. His first film appearance was as Captain Walter Kosciuszko "Painless Pole" Waldowski in M*A*S*H (1970). As Painless, Schuck holds a place in Hollywood history as the first person to say "fuck" in a major studio film. He went on to appear in several more Altman films: Brewster McCloud (1970), McCabe & Mrs. Miller (1971), and Thieves Like Us (1974).

In 1970 he appeared as insurance salesman and former Minnesota Vikings lineman Frank Carelli in Episode 5 of the first season of The Mary Tyler Moore Show, "Keep Your Guard Up."

From 1971 to 1977, Schuck appeared as San Francisco Police Detective Sergeant Charles Enright in the television series McMillan & Wife and also starred as an overseer in the miniseries Roots. In 1976, he played Gregory "Yoyo" Yoyonovich in the short-lived series Holmes & Yoyo; both it and McMillan & Wife were created and produced by Leonard B. Stern for what is now NBCUniversal Television. Schuck starred in ABC's 1979 TV holiday special The Halloween That Almost Wasn't as the Frankenstein Monster. (He would again use the Universal International Frankenstein-monster makeup format in The Munsters Today; see below.) He played Ox, a jewel thief in "The Love Boat" S1 E15 "Caper" which aired 1/20/1978. In 1979 he starred in a short-lived TV series version of Turnabout, where he and Sharon Gless played Sam and Penny, a couple who trade bodies. Some installments from that comedy series were reedited into the made-for-TV film Magic Statue, named for the artifact that caused the body-swap.

In the 1970s–80s, Schuck was also a regular "guest celebrity" on game shows such as Pyramid, Hollywood Squares, Password Plus and Super Password and The Cross-Wits.

During this period, he made his Broadway debut playing Oliver "Daddy" Warbucks as a replacement in the role of the original Broadway musical comedy Annie at the Alvin Theatre, for a special three-week engagement. In 1980, he began appearing as a "regular replacement" for a year and a half, along with Allison Smith as Annie and Alice Ghostley as Miss Hannigan.

=== Later work ===
In 1986, Schuck took the role of Klingon ambassador Kamarag in Star Trek IV: The Voyage Home. He reprised the role in 1991 in Star Trek VI: The Undiscovered Country.

Also in the 1980s, Schuck starred as Herman Munster in the syndicated situation comedy The Munsters Today, co-starring Lee Meriwether as Lily Munster. In character as Herman, a role Fred Gwynne originated in the 1960s, Schuck was made up as the Frankenstein Monster, according to the makeup format whose copyright NBCUniversal still owns, for the second time in his career; the first (see above) was in The Halloween That Almost Wasn't.

He guest starred in Star Trek: Deep Space Nine as Legate Parn, Star Trek: Voyager as Chorus #3, Star Trek: Enterprise as Antaak, and Babylon 5 as Draal in "The Long, Twilight Struggle" (1995). In 1994, he appeared as Ralgha nar Hhallas (callsign Hobbes) in Wing Commander III: Heart of the Tiger. He then guest-starred in several episodes of Law & Order: Special Victims Unit as the NYPD Chief of Detectives Muldrew.

Under his full name of "Conrad John Schuck," he opened in the role of Daddy Warbucks in the 1997 Broadway revival of Annie and in 2005 and 2006 toured nationally in the role. He later appeared in the films Holy Matrimony and String of the Kite.

In 2013, Schuck appeared as Senator Max Evergreen in Nice Work If You Can Get It. In 2017, Schuck joined the cast of writer/director Chris Blake's indie horror film All Light Will End.

=== Personal life ===
Schuck married actress Susan Bay, with whom he had a son, Aaron Bay-Schuck, a music industry executive and co-writer of the hit "Right Round". The couple divorced in 1983; Bay would marry actor Leonard Nimoy, who would direct Schuck in Star Trek IV: The Voyage Home. He married his current wife, painter Harrison Houlé, in 1990.

== Filmography ==
=== Television ===
Year	Title	Role	Notes
1969	NET Playhouse	uncredited	Episode: "Glory! Hallelujah" (S4.E3)
1969-1970	Gunsmoke	Amos Blake/Burt Tilden	2 Episodes: "Coreyville"/"The Thieves"
1970	Mission: Impossible	Lieutenant Jocaro	Episode: "Death Squad" (S4.E24)
1970	The Mary Tyler Moore Show	Frank Carelli	Episode: "Keep Your Guard Up"
1970	Room 222	Harry Collin	Episode: "The Fuzz That Grooved"
1971	Bonanza	Tom Brennan	Episode: "A Single Pilgrim"
1971-1977	McMillan & Wife	Charles Enright	39 episodes
1972	Ironside	Archie Baldwin	Episode: "Bubble, Bubble, Toil and Murder"
1972	Love, American Style	Marvin Fratbush	Episode: "Love and the President"
1972	Cade's County	Luke Edwards	2 episodes
1975	Movin' On	Teddy Brown	Episode: "The Price of Loving"
1976–1977	Holmes & Yoyo	Gregory Yoyonovich	Main role (13 episodes)
1977	Roots	Ordell	Episode: "Part V"
1978	The Love Boat	Ox	2 episodes
1978-1980	Fantasy Island	Chuck Huffman/Mark Hendricks	2 episodes
1979	Turnabout	Sam Alston/Penny Alston	Main role (7 episodes)
1981	Palmerstown, U.S.A.	uncredited	Episode: "The Black Travelers: II"
1982	Simon & Simon	various	4 episodes
1982-1983	The New Odd Couple	Officer Murray Greshler	10 episodes
1984	Partners in Crime	Pierce	Episodes: "Pilot"
1984	St. Elsewhere	Andrew Wegener	4 episodes
1984	E/R	Jack	Episode: "Both Sides Now"
1984	Murder, She Wrote	Captain Davis	Episode: "We're Off to Kill the Wizard"
1986	Murder, She Wrote	Chief Merton P. Drock	Episode: "Stage Struck"
1986	Diff'rent Strokes	Carl	Episode: "Arnold's Initiation"
1987	Matlock	Reporter Carl Burke	Episode: “The Author” (S1.E14)
1987	L.A. Law	Deputy D.A. Stanley Kunin	Episode: "December Bribe"
1987	MacGyver	Joe Henderson	Episode: "Bushmaster" (S2.E19)
1987	The Golden Girls	Gil Kessler	Episode: "Strange Bedfellows"
1987	J.J. Starbuck	Powell Umber	Episode: "Graveyard Shift"
1988-1991	The Munsters Today	Herman Munster	73 episodes
1991	The Young Riders	Jarvis	Episode: "Jesse"
1992	Four Eyes and Six Guns	Charlie Winniger	TV Movie
1992	Rugrats	Leo, Reptar, Western Man (voice)	Episode: "Reptar on Ice"
1993	Sisters	Dr. Stanley Livingston	Episode: "Some Other Time"
1994	Time Trax	Dr. Carter Bach	Episode: "The Gravity of It All"
1994	Star Trek: Deep Space Nine	Legate Parn	Episode: "The Maquis"
1995	Live Shot	Ellis Maitland	2 episodes
1995	NYPD Blue	Carl Wuthrich	Episode: "Torah! Torah! Torah!"
1995	Freakazoid!	Arms Akimbo (voice)	Episode: "In Arm's Way"
1995–1996	Babylon 5	Draal	2 episodes
1996	The Bonnie Hunt Show	Lance Ochsner	2 episodes
1997	Hey Arnold!	Wally, Announcer (voice)	Episode: "Ransom/Mrs Perfect"
1999	Starship Regulars	voice roles	2 episodes
1999	Arli$$	Buddy	Episode: "The Stories You Don't Hear About"
1999-2000	Diagnosis: Murder	Police Captain	2 episodes
2000	Star Trek: Voyager	Chorus #2	Episode: "Muse"
2001	Law & Order	Stefan Havel	Episode: "Possession"
2001	Titus	Bob Marshall	Episode: "Shannon's Song"
2004–2010	Law & Order: Special Victims Unit	Chief Muldrew	8 episodes
2005	Star Trek: Enterprise	Antaak	2-part episode: "Affliction" "Divergence"
2009-2011	Zeke and Luther	Carl	4 episodes

=== Film ===
Year	Title	Role	Notes
1970	M*A*S*H	Capt. Walter "Painless Pole" Waldowski	
1970	The Moonshine War	E.J. Royce	
1970	Brewster McCloud	Officer Johnson	
1971	McCabe & Mrs. Miller	Smalley	
1972	Hammersmith Is Out	Henry Joe	
1973	Blade	Reardon	
1974	Thieves Like Us	Chicamaw	
1979	Butch and Sundance: The Early Days	Harvey Logan, Kid Curry	
1979	Just You and Me, Kid	Stan	
1981	Earthbound	Sheriff De Rita	
1984	Finders Keepers	Police Chief Norris	
1986	Star Trek IV: The Voyage Home	Klingon Ambassador	
1987	Outrageous Fortune	Agent Atkins	
1988	The New Adventures of Pippi Longstocking	Efraim Longstocking	
1989	My Mom's a Werewolf	Howard Shaber	
1989	Second Sight	Lieutenant Manoogian	
1990	Dick Tracy	Reporter	
1991	Star Trek VI: The Undiscovered Country	Klingon Ambassador	
1994	Holy Matrimony	Markowski	
1994	Pontiac Moon	Officer	
1995	Demon Knight	Sheriff Tupper	
2001	The Curse of the Jade Scorpion	Mize	
2014	Closer to God	Sydney	
2018	All Light Will End	Psychiatrist	
2023	The Hiding Place	Casper Ten Boom	

=== Video games ===
Year	Title	Role	Notes
1994	Wing Commander III: Heart of the Tiger	Ralgha nar Hhallas	
