= Daydream Believer (2001 film) =

- Directed by: Debra Eisenstadt
- Written by: Debra Eisenstadt
- Produced by: Debra Eisenstadt
- Starring: Sybil Kempson
- Cinematography: Debra Eisenstadt
- Edited by: Debra Eisenstadt
- Music by: Jenifer Jackson
- Release dates: January 21, 2001 (Slamdance); September 25, 2002 (limited)
- Running time: 79 minutes
- Country: United States
- Language: English

Daydream Believer is a 2001 American film written and directed by Debra Eisenstadt and starring Sybil Kempson.

== Cast ==
- Sybil Kempson as Valerie Woodbury
- Gladden Schrock as Boyd
- Wendy Lawrence as Wendy
- Andrew Hernin as Carl
- Louis Puopolo as Kent Black
- Sherri Parker Lee as Pamella

== Reception ==
The film has a 100% rating on Rotten Tomatoes.

=== Accolade ===
At the 17th Independent Spirit Awards, Eisenstadt won the Someone to Watch Award for her work in the film.
