= The Hiding Place (Bell novel) =

2012 novel by David Bell

- Author: David Bell
- Cover artist: Mimi Bark
- Language: English
- Genre: Thriller, Mystery, Fiction
- Published: October 2nd,2012
- Publisher: New American Library
- Publication place: The United States of America
- ISBN: 978-0-451-23796-5

The Hiding Place is a 378-page fiction mystery book by David Bell. This novel was published October 2, 2012 by New American Library, an imprint of Penguin Books USA.

== Plot ==
The Hiding Place starts off at a park in the small town of Dove Point, Ohio where Janet Manning and her younger brother Justin Manning are sent to play alone. Janet loses track of her brother while playing with her friend. She left him playing in the sandbox. When it's time to leave Justin is missing, no one can find him.

Two months after Justin's disappearance, a boy's body was found in the forest outside of the park. They assumed this body belonged to 4 year old Justin, but they did not have the technology at the time to be completely sure.

Dante Rogers (alleged pedophile) went to jail for 20 years for his murder. The police arrested and charged him as he had photos of children in his room. One of these children was of Justin.

25 years after Justin went missing, Janet is 32 and isn't sure what happened that day at the park. She meets a suspicious man who looks like her brother. He comes to her home one night. After the strange meeting with this man, she decides to try to find out what really happened to Justin.

Ashleigh Manning, Janet's 16-year-old daughter also wonders what happened to her uncle. One night she hears a sound at the door, and listens to a conversation between her mother and a strange man. She digs more into this man and finds out his name; Justin Manning. But Justin Manning is dead.

== Main characters ==
- Janet: the protagonist. She has gone through many hardships as a single mom and having her mother and brother die. She is 32 years old with brown hair and dark eyes, and is described as looking younger than she is. Janet is always looking over her shoulder after she moves back to Dove Point with her daughter to take care of her unemployed father, Bill Manning, who doesn't want to acknowledge his son's death. She prefers not to be interviewed about her brother, yet she allows it every few years. she is very protective of them and hopes that they can all one day come to terms to the effects of Justin's death.
- Ashleigh: she always rushes in head first, without thinking about consequences. She feels that she cannot talk about Justin around her family or friends as it burdens them. In her hunt for answers she works alone, only revealing what she finds after she is assaulted while looking for proof about the man at the door. Ashleigh starts off as a reckless character, but matures with detective instincts.
- Detective Stein: one of the original detectives on the case. He finds himself unable to put it down after he retires. He checks in with the Manning family and Dante Rodgers throughout the novel. Janet finds him to be like a grandfather to her.

== Reception ==
Publishers Weekly list of bestselling novels in the United States in the 2010s wrote, “An artfully constructed tale that charts the devastating, life-changing effects over twenty-five years on the people most effected by the murder of a four-year-old … a powerful, provocative novel.”

Bowling Green Daily News wrote, “A gem of a book… Bell has written another winning thriller that is certain to entertain, frighten and swiftly climb bestseller lists”

Suspense Magazine wrote, “David Bell does a masterful job of crafting a crime story, with the guilty and innocent existing right next to each other, whether they realize it or not. He has also created tense drama of emotions and relationships.it is a riveting book with surprising but believable twists on every page.”
