= Christine Sneed =

American novelist and short story writer

Christine Sneed is an American author — the novels Little Known Facts (2013), Paris, He Said (2015), and Please Be Advised (2022), and the story collections Portraits of a Few of the People I've Made Cry (2010), The Virginity of Famous Men (2016), and Direct Sunlight (2023) — as well as a graduate-level fiction professor at Northwestern University. She also teaches creative writing for Stanford University Continuing Studies. She is the recipient of the Chicago Public Library Foundation's 21st Century Award, the John C. Zacharis First Book Award (via Ploughshares), the Society of Midland Authors Award, the 2009 AWP Grace Paley Prize for Short Fiction, and the Chicago Writers' Association Book of the Year Award in both 2011 and 2017.

== Life ==
Born September 24, 1971, Sneed grew up in Green Bay, Wisconsin, and Libertyville, Illinois. She earned an undergraduate degree from Georgetown University, where she studied French language and literature, and a Master of Fine Arts in creative writing from Indiana University Bloomington.

Sneed's work has appeared in the anthologies The Best American Short Stories 2008, The PEN/O. Henry Prize Stories 2012, and New Stories from the Midwest 2016; the literary journals Ploughshares, New England Review, The Southern Review, Meridian, Glimmer Train, Pleiades, The Massachusetts Review, and The Greensboro Review; and The New York Times, San Francisco Chronicle, and Chicago Tribune as well as other publications.

She lives in Pasadena, California.

== Works ==
- Direct Sunlight (TriQuarterly), June 15, 2023. ISBN 978-0810146167
- Please Be Advised (7.13 Books), October 18, 2022. ISBN 979-8985376265
- The Virginity of Famous Men (Bloomsbury), September 13, 2016. ISBN 978-1620406953
- Paris, He Said (Bloomsbury), May 5, 2015. ISBN 978-1620406922
- Little Known Facts (Bloomsbury), February 12, 2013. ISBN 978-1608199587
- Portraits of a Few of the People I’ve Made Cry (University of Massachusetts Press), November 30, 2010. ISBN 978-1-55849-858-7
- The PEN/O. Henry Prize Stories 2012 (Anchor); short story "The First Wife," April 17, 2012. ISBN 978-0307947888
- The Best American Short Stories 2008 (Houghton Mifflin); short story "Quality of Life," October 8, 2008. ISBN 978-0618788774

as editor:

- Love in the Time of Time's Up (Tortoise Books), October 4, 2022. ISBN 978-1948954716

== Reviews ==
- "'The Virginity of Famous Men' Has Characters on Edge". New York Times Book Review. 2016-09-25.
- Black, Robin (2015-06-07). "'Paris, He Said,' by Christine Sneed". New York Times Book Review.
- Sittenfeld, Curtis (2013-02-24). "A Star's Circle". New York Times Book Review.
- Paul Wilner (December 26, 2010). "'Portraits ...,' by Christine Sneed: review". The San Francisco Chronicle.
- "Interview with the Second Wife" by Christine Sneed, The Collagist, Lori Ostlund

== Awards and honors ==
- Chicago Writers' Association Book of the Year Award (2011 and 2017)
- Illinois Reads selection (2016)
- Chicago Review of Books Fiction Award, Finalist (2016)
- Society of Midland Authors Award, Best Adult Fiction (2013)
- 21st Century Award, Chicago Public Library Foundation (2013)
- Chicago Magazine's Best New Book by a New Author (2013)
- O. Henry Prize (2012)
- John C. Zacharis Award—Ploughshares' First Book Award (2011)
- Art Seidenbaum/Los Angeles Times Book Prize, Finalist, First fiction category (2011)
- Frank O'Connor International Short Story Award, long-listed (2011)
- Grace Paley Prize in Short Fiction (2009)
