= Something old =

First line of a traditional rhyme

Items chosen to bring good luck to the bride. In this case, the veil was borrowed and the handkerchief was new.

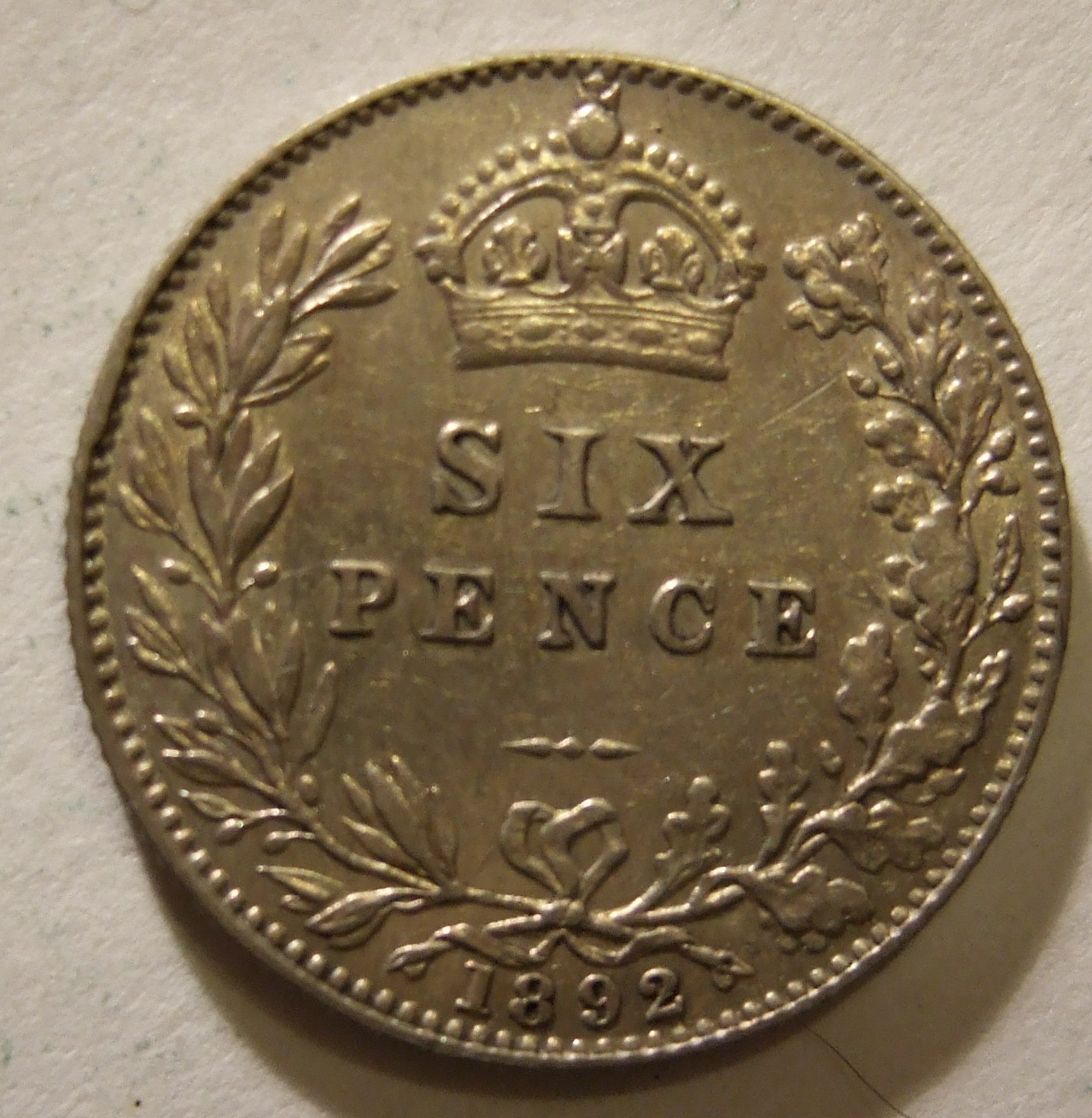
A British Victorian sixpence, traditionally worn in the bride's left shoe on her wedding day

"Something old" is the first line of a traditional rhyme that details what a bride should wear at her wedding for good luck:

Something old,
something new,
something borrowed,
something blue,
and a [silver] sixpence in her shoe.

The old item provides protection for the baby to come. The new item offers optimism for the future. The item borrowed from another happily married couple provides good luck. The colour blue is a sign of purity and fidelity. The sixpence — a British silver coin — is a symbol of prosperity or acts as a ward against evil done by frustrated suitors.

== Folklore ==
An 1898 compilation of English folklore recounted that:

In this country an old couplet directs that the bride shall wear:—"Something old, something new, something borrowed, something blue." "The something blue" takes, I am given to understand, usually the form of a garter, an article of dress which plays an important part in some wedding rites, as, for instance, in the old custom of plucking off the garter of the bride. "The something old" and "something blue" are devices to baffle the Evil Eye. The usual effect on the bride of the Evil Eye is to render her barren, and this is obviated by wearing "something borrowed", which should properly be the undergarment of some woman who has been blessed with children: the clothes communicate fertility to the bride.

The earliest recorded version of the first two lines is in 1871 in the short story, "Marriage Superstitions, and the Miseries of a Bride Elect" in St James' Magazine, when the female narrator states, "On the wedding day I must 'wear something new, something borrowed, something blue.'"

The first recorded version of the rhyme as we now know it (the so-called Lancashire version) was in a 1876 newspaper, which reported a wedding where the bride "wore, according to ancient custom, something old and something new, something borrowed and blue."

Another compilation of the era frames this poem as "a Lancashire version", as contrast against a Leicestershire recitation that "a bride on her wedding day should wear—'Something new, Something blue, Something borrowed' ...", and so omits the "something old". The authors note that this counters other regional folklore warning against the wearing of blue on the wedding day, but relates the use of the colour to phrases like "true blue" which make positive associations with the colour.

The final line "and a sixpence in her shoe" is a later Victorian addition; the coin should be worn in the left shoe.

In 1894, the saying was recorded in Ireland, in the Annual Report and Proceedings of the Belfast Naturalists' Field Club, where it was attributed to County Monaghan folklore.

The wearing of the five items detailed in the rhyme is still popular in the UK and US.

== Historical examples ==
In 1981, at the wedding of Prince Charles and Lady Diana Spencer, the bride wore:

- something old – a square of Carrickmacross lace attached to Lady Diana's gown that once belonged to Queen Mary of Teck
- something new – silk spun at Lullingstone silk farm in Dorset
- something borrowed – a tiara from the Spencer family collection
- something blue – a blue bow sewn into the waistband of her dress

In 2011, at the wedding of Prince William and Catherine Middleton, the bride wore:

- something old – Carrickmacross lace
- something new – a pair of diamond earrings made by jewellers Robinson Pelham and given by her parents
- something borrowed – the Halo Tiara, a diamond tiara made by Cartier which had been bought for The Queen Mother, and which was subsequently given to Elizabeth II on her 18th birthday
- something blue – a small ribbon sewn into the inside of the dress

In 2011, at the wedding of Zara Phillips and Mike Tindall, the bride wore:

- something old – a pair of diamond earrings
- something new – her wedding dress, made by Stewart Parvin
- something borrowed – the Meander Tiara, a diamond tiara with Greek key pattern, often worn by her mother Princess Anne
- something blue – blue nail polish on her toenails

In 2018, at the wedding of Prince Harry and Meghan Markle, the bride wore:

- something old – sprigs of myrtle in the bouquet, and fabric from the wedding dress of Lady Diana Spencer
- something new – Givenchy wedding gown (designed by Clare Waight Keller), veil, and shoes, and Cartier jewelry, diamond earrings, and bracelet
- something borrowed – the Diamond Bandeau Tiara, loaned by the Queen for the occasion
- something blue – blue fabric sewn into the hem of the dress

In 2018, at the wedding of Princess Eugenie and Jack Brooksbank, the bride wore:

- something old – Greville Emerald Kokoshnik Tiara
- something new – new emerald drop earrings, a gift from the groom
- something borrowed – the Queen's Greville Emerald Kokoshnik Tiara
- something blue – blue thistle flowers in her bouquet

In 2020, at the wedding of Princess Beatrice and Edoardo Mapelli Mozzi, the bride wore:

- something old – her dress, borrowed from Queen Elizabeth II, a Norman Hartnell dress made in 1962 for the Queen to wear at the world premiere of Lawrence of Arabia
- something new – the "upcycling" performed to the dress, modernising the hemline and adding organza sleeves
- something borrowed – the Queen Mary Fringe Tiara, a diamond tiara which was also worn by Elizabeth II at her wedding to Prince Philip
- something blue – unclear, but the South African Sunday Times wrote that the "something blue" was Beatrice's blue blood; she was ninth in line to the British throne at the time.

== In popular culture ==
=== Books and films ===
- By 1905, the full rhyme had crossed the Atlantic to the United States as it appeared in the novel Purple and Fine Linen by Emily Post.
- Two romantic comedies take their titles from the rhyme: Something New (2006) and Something Borrowed (2011), the latter of which was based on Emily Giffin's 2005 book of the same name.
- In the Rainbow Magic Book Mia the Bridesmaid Fairy by Daisy Meadows the fairy must find 'lucky items' that are "Kirsty's grandmother's brooch as something old, Esther's wedding dress as something new, Kirsty's golden anklet as something borrowed, the blue feather as something blue, and Rachel's sixpence anklet as the sixpence."
- In the fourth book in the Twilight Saga, Breaking Dawn, when Bella is getting ready for her wedding, her mom and dad gift her a pair of old silver hair combs (something old) with dark blue sapphires embedded in them (something blue). There, after Alice throws a pair of garters that Bella has to give back (something borrowed). Alice also states that Bella's wedding dress was new (something new).

=== Songs ===
- The 1971 single "Something Old, Something New" by The Fantastics (formerly known as The Velours), which reached number 9 in the UK charts
- Placebo's song "Every You Every Me" (1999) contains the line "Something borrowed, something blue".
- On Ihsahn's album Eremita (2012) is a song entitled "Something Out There", which uses the lyrics "something old, something new, something borrowed, something blue".
- The rhyme is referenced in the Fall Out Boy song, "I Slept With Someone In Fall Out Boy And All I Got Was This Stupid Song Written About Me". At the near end of the song, Patrick Stump and Pete Wentz sing "Someone old, no one new, feeling borrowed, always blue".
- In the Taylor Swift song, "Lover", she sings "My heart's been borrowed and yours has been blue, all's well that ends well to end up with you".
- In the Voilà song, "Something Blue", the chorus uses most of the rhyme "Something old, something new, something borrowed, something blue", using the rhyme to compare the narrator (something old) to the groom (something new).

=== Television ===
- In the 1957 televised musical, Cinderella, as the title character prepares for her wedding, she asks her step-family, whom she has forgiven for their cruelty, to give her something old, new, borrowed, and blue. Her stepsister Joy gives her a lace handkerchief (something old) and her necklace (something borrowed); her stepsister Portia gives her gloves (something new); and her stepmother gives her a leg ribbon (something blue).
- In the Golden Girls episode, "Mixed Blessings" (1988), Dorothy's son Michael and his fiancée Lorraine are about to go into a chapel to elope. Rose states that Lorraine doesn't have something old, new, borrowed, or blue. Lorraine's mother gives her a blue scarf (something blue), Dorothy gives her a watch to borrow (something borrowed), Blanche gives her earrings worn by Blanche's grandma (something old), and the child Lorraine is pregnant with is counted as something new.
- In the Thomas & Friends episode, "Happy Ever After" (1998), Percy is instructed by Mrs. Kyndley to pick up four items that are old, new, borrowed and blue respectively in order to construct a good luck package for her daughter's wedding. These include Old Slow Coach (old) a set of buffers (new), the flatbed carrying the buffers (borrowed) and Thomas himself (blue).
- The ninth episode of the fourth season of Buffy the Vampire Slayer is entitled "Something Blue" (1999) in reference to both Willow's grief and the engagement plans Buffy and Spike make as they're affected by a spell gone wrong cast by Willow herself.
- In the Friends episode "The One in Vegas" (1999), Monica says to Chandler she needs 'Something old, something new, something borrowed, something blue' so they can marry. They got a new, blue sweater stolen from the shop (borrowed) and Chandler's old condom. In "The One With Monica And Chandler's Wedding, Part 2" (2001), Phoebe discovers Rachel's positive pregnancy test, assumed to be Monica's, and Phoebe asks if the baby counts as Monica's something new. In "The One With Phoebe's Wedding" (2004), when Phoebe decides not to wear her coat while getting married outside in the snow, she says "I can be my something blue", suggesting that she might go blue with coldness.
- In the Smallville season 8 episode Bride, Chloe Sullivan, who is marrying Jimmy Olsen, comments to her cousin Lois Lane that she already has something old, blue and new and just needs something borrowed to "round out the tradition". In the season 10 episode "Icarus", Lois Lane receives a surprise congratulatory letter containing a necklace as "something borrowed" from the disappeared Chloe for Lois's engagement to Clark Kent. In the series finale, Chloe sends Lois a blue ribbon as "something blue" for Lois's upcoming wedding to Clark.
- In the Grey's Anatomy episode "Now or Never", Cristina references the rhyme in a conversation with Meredith by giving her some blue items, namely an old post-it containing a grocery list, a new post-it, and a borrowed pen. In the episode "White Wedding", Callie Torres asks to borrow something from Sloan Riley, saying that she already has something old, new and blue, in preparation for her wedding.
- In the Mama's Family episode "The Wedding: Part 1", Mama's daughter Eunice asks her future sister-in-law if she has "something old, something new, something borrowed, and something blue" and Naomi the bride reveals that Mama gave her a sapphire ring - the same sapphire ring that Eunice has wanted since the death of her grandfather.
- In the ER seventh season episode 18 "April Showers", Isabelle Corday, Dr. Elizabeth Corday's mother, hands her daughter a pair of family heirloom earrings the morning of Elizabeth's wedding, mentioning, "Something old, something new, something borrowed...."
- The final two episodes of Season 2 of How I Met Your Mother are titled "Something Borrowed" and "Something Blue" in reference to the wedding occurring between the characters Marshall and Lily on the show. The final two episodes of Season 8 of the series are titled "Something Old" and "Something New" in reference to the wedding occurring between the characters Barney and Robin on the show.
- The ninth episode of series two of Torchwood is entitled "Something Borrowed" in reference to the wedding occurring between the characters Gwen Cooper and Rhys Williams on the show.
- In "The Big Bang", the final episode of season 5 of Doctor Who, the Doctor's companions, Amy Pond and Rory Williams, get married. During the wedding, Amy interrupts her father's speech to make a speech of her own when she remembers the existence of the Doctor and his TARDIS, bringing them back to existence. During the speech, she uses the phrase "Something old. Something new. Something borrowed. Something blue." to describe the TARDIS, which symbolizes the Doctor himself. The phrase represents the TARDIS as: Something Old (the Doctor/TARDIS), New (rebuilt/regenerated), Borrowed (borrowed time), and Blue (the TARDIS color).
- In the Superjail! episode "Gay Wedding," prison guard Alice has one of the grooms wear an old metal bra, a new bridal veil, a borrowed pink thong, and a blue miniskirt.
- In the penultimate episode "We're Planning a June Wedding" of the popular series The Vampire Diaries, lead character Caroline Forbes receives a card reading "Something old, something new, something borrowed, something blue", and during the episode she receives items which signify the phrase for her wedding. Something old from Stefan, Elena's necklace (something borrowed), a floral-looking headband from her friend Bonnie (something new), and Katherine's necklace (something blue).
- In Outlander season 5, episode 1, "The fiery cross", Jamie prepares the tradition for Brianna's wedding.
- In Anne with an E, when Prissy is to be married, the girls sit around her to see what she has. Diana gets her a six pence from England.
- In Dr. Quinn, Medicine Woman, when the title character gets married, her sister gives her their great-grandmothers handkerchief as something old.
- In Lucifer protagonist plays around the rhyme for Maze's and Eve's wedding by allowing Maze's siblings (ancient Lilim demons from Hell) to attend their sister's event possessing i.e. borrowing fresh deceased bodies with nasty blue spots.
- In The Rookie season 3 finale, officer Jackson West collects items for fellow officer Angela Lopez for her wedding – a handed-down brooch from Patrice Evers (mother of to-be husband Wesley) as something old, a pack of spearmint gum from himself as something new, a good luck charm from officer John Nolan made by his son as something borrowed, and a pocket square from sergeant Wade Grey as something blue.
- In POSE season 3, episode 6, Angel gets Blanca's mother's cookbook, a lavish white fur from Elektra, Lulu's one month sobriety token, and finally the three bridesmaids together give Angel the deceased Candy's iconic hammer wrapped in Tiffany's blue crepe.
- In Something Very Bad Is Going to Happen, episode 6, Rachael Harkin summons her ancestor who recites a corrupted version of the adage as advice on how to escape the marriage-related curse set upon her family.

== See also ==
- Something old, something new (disambiguation)
- Something New (disambiguation)
- Something Borrowed (disambiguation)
- Something Blue (disambiguation)
- Old New Borrowed Blue
- Old New Borrowed and Blue
- Coventry blue
