= Something Borrowed =

Something Borrowed may refer to:

- Something Borrowed (novel), by Emily Giffin
  - Something Borrowed (film), based on the novel
- "Something Borrowed" (How I Met Your Mother)
- "Something Borrowed" (Torchwood)
- Something Borrowed - Something Blue, a 1966 album by Gerry Mulligan
- Something Borrowed, Something Blue, a 1978 album by Tommy Flanagan
- "Something Borrowed", a story by Jim Butcher

== See also ==
- Something old
- Something New (disambiguation)
- Something Blue (disambiguation)
