= Something Blue (disambiguation) =

Something Blue refers to a tradition about what brides should wear on their wedding day.

Something Blue may also refer to:

== Books ==
- Something Blue (novel), a 2006 book by Emily Giffin
- Something Blue, by Ann Hood 1991

== Film and TV ==
- Something Blue (film), a movie based on the Emily Giffin novel
- "Something Blue" (Buffy the Vampire Slayer), a 1999 television episode
- "Something Blue" (Elsbeth), a 2024 television episode
- "Something Blue" (The Gentle Touch), a 1980 television episode
- "Something Blue" (How I Met Your Mother), a 2007 television episode

== Music ==
- Something Blue (Paul Horn album), a 1960 jazz album by Paul Horn
- Something Blue (Lightnin' Hopkins album), a 1967 blues album by Lightnin' Hopkins
- Something Blue (Chara album), a 2005 album by Chara
- Something Borrowed - Something Blue, a 1966 album by Gerry Mulligan
- "Something Blue", a 1962 Elvis Presley song, from the album Pot Luck

== See also ==
- Something old
- Something New (disambiguation)
- Something Borrowed (disambiguation)
