= Something old, something new (disambiguation) =

"Something old, something new", a traditional rhyme about what a bride should wear at her wedding for good luck

Something old, something new may also refer to:

== Media ==
- "Something Old, Something New", an episode of the television series The Apprentice
- "Something Old, Something New", an episode of the television series The Hills
- "Something Old, Something New", an episode of the television program Project Runway Canada
- Something Old, Something New (album), a 1963 studio album by Dizzy Gillespie
- Something Old, Something New, an album by Don Cherry
- Something Old, Something New, an album by Billy Parker
- Something Old, Something New, an album by Stéphane Grappelli
- Something Old, Something New, a 1966 album by The Olympics
- Something Old, Something New, an album by Jerry Jerome
- Something Old, and Something New!, a 1959 album by Sammy Herman, xylophonist
- Something Old, Something New, Something Blue, Something Else!, an album by The Crickets
- Something Old, Something New, an album by Chris Duarte
- "Something Old, Something New" (song), a 1953 country song recorded by Eddy Arnold
- "Something Old, Something New", a 1971 song recorded by the Fantastics

== See also ==
- "Something Old", an episode of the TV series How I Met Your Mother
