= Coventry blue =

Blue cloth woven and dyed with woad

Coventry blue was a blue cloth woven and dyed with woad in Coventry. The permanence of the colour led to the phrase "as true as Coventry blue" or "true blue".

Bride-laces were wedding favours traditionally made as sprigs of rosemary tied with blue ribbon which were worn by wedding guests. Coventry blue ribbons were commonly used for these until festivities were suppressed by the Puritans during the Interregnum (1649–1660). The exact recipe for Coventry blue was then lost as a result of the disruption and decline in trade.

== See also ==
- Lincoln green
- Something old
