= Finale (Smallville) =

- Smallville episodes
- The final shot of the episode (lower) was modeled after iconic scenes from the Christopher Reeve Superman films (upper).
- Episode nos.: Season 10; Episodes 21 and 22
- Directed by: Kevin G. Fair (Part 1); Greg Beeman (Part 2)
- Written by: Al Septien; Turi Meyer (Part 1); Kelly Souders; Brian Peterson (Part 2)
- Production codes: 3X6020 (Part 1); 3X6022 (Part 2)
- Original air date: May 13, 2011
- Running time: 84 minutes

Guest appearances
- John Schneider as Jonathan Kent; Annette O'Toole as Martha Kent (Part 1 only); Steve Byers as Desaad; Christine Willes as Granny Goodness; Michael Daingerfield as Gordon Godfrey; Michael Rosenbaum as Lex Luthor (Part 2 only); John Glover as Lionel Luthor (Part 2 only); Aaron Ashmore as Jimmy Olsen (Part 2 only); Terence Stamp as the voice of Jor-El (Part 2 only)

Episode chronology
| ← Previous "Prophecy" | Next → — |
- Smallville season 10

"Finale" is the two-part series finale of the superhero television series Smallville, developed by Alfred Gough and Miles Millar. The episodes are the 21st and 22nd of the tenth season, and the 216th and 217th episodes overall. The finale originally aired on The CW in the United States on May 13, 2011. The first half was written by Al Septien and Turi Meyer, and directed by Kevin G. Fair, and the second half was written by showrunners and executive producers Kelly Souders and Brian Peterson, and directed by Greg Beeman.

The series follows the adventures of the young Clark Kent (Tom Welling) in the fictional town of Smallville, Kansas, before he becomes Superman. In the series finale, Tess Mercer (Cassidy Freeman) learns that the planet Apokolips is coming to destroy humanity, and that Oliver Queen (Justin Hartley) is under the possession of Darkseid. Meanwhile, Lionel Luthor from Earth-2 (John Glover) attempts to bring his deceased doppelgänger's son Lex (Michael Rosenbaum) back to life. Clark finally realizes his true destiny, just in time to stop Darkseid's arrival on Earth. The finale episodes feature a flashforward seven years into the future, revealing Clark's new superhero persona, Superman.

The episodes, written in advance during the fall of 2010, were conceived to successfully bring an end to the series. Peterson and Souders attempted to preserve the intended ending envisioned by Gough and Millar several years earlier. The episodes featured the return of several former series regulars, including John Schneider, Annette O'Toole, Rosenbaum, and Aaron Ashmore. In addition, Michael McKean reprised his guest role in an uncredited voice cameo. The episode contained several overt references, homages, and connections to previous Superman franchises, such as the films Superman (1978) and Superman Returns (2006).

Upon its premiere, the finale was watched by 3.35 million viewers. The episodes received generally positive reviews from commentators, many of whom felt that the series was successfully able to wrap up its story arcs. Rosenbaum's return was met with critical applause, but the artistic decision to not show Welling in the full Superman suit and instead to render Superman using computer-generated imagery (CGI) was met with negativity.

== Plot ==
=== Part 1 ===
Seven years in the future, Chloe reads a Smallville comic book detailing the rise of Superman, to her son. In the present, Lois and Clark argue about their upcoming wedding. Lois wants to call off the wedding, believing that she is hindering Clark's destiny. Chloe gives Lois a copy of Clark's vows to help convince her to go through with the wedding. Meanwhile, Clark has a discussion with his mother Martha about letting go of the past. Clark visits Lois at their apartment, where she tells him that the wedding is on, admitting that she read his vows, and gives him hers in exchange. Clark reads her vows and tells her that he will meet her at the chapel.

At the destroyed Luthor Mansion, Tess is confronted by Granny Goodness, who offers her one final chance to join Darkseid's forces to spare her life during the coming destruction. Tess refuses, declaring that, just because she was born a Luthor, her fate is not sealed. At Watchtower, discovering that Oliver disabled the organization's satellites, Tess brings up previous satellite footage revealing the planet Apokolips descending toward Earth. Before Tess can warn the team, she is ambushed by a group of armed men and taken captive. Granny Goodness, Desaad, and Gordon Godfrey meet in their lair. Oliver—possessed by the power of Darkseid—arrives and is instructed to remove Clark's powers with a gold kryptonite wedding ring. At the wedding, Chloe realizes the ring is kryptonite and stops Oliver. Clark helps Oliver overcome Darkseid's control just as Apokolips enters Earth's atmosphere.

=== Part 2 ===
Tess, awakening on a table inside a laboratory, is greeted by the alternate version of Lionel Luthor from Earth-2, who reveals that they are underneath the ruins of the Luthor Mansion, where Lex has been hiding, taking his clones' vital parts and grafting them to his body to mend himself. Lionel attempts to use Tess's heart to bring Lex back to life, but she breaks free and fatally shoots Lionel during her escape. Lionel makes a deal with Darkseid to bring Lex to life in exchange for Lionel's soul. Clark tracks Tess to the mansion, where he is confronted by Lex. Clark apologizes for not being able to save Lex from the loss of his soul, but declares that he will always be there to stop Lex in the future. Oliver confronts Granny Goodness, Desaad, and Godfrey, dispatching them with three arrows. At LuthorCorp, Tess confronts Lex, who reveals that he always knew that she was his sister and that he used her. Lex embraces Tess, and stabs her in the stomach as he tells her he loves her, claiming to be saving her from becoming like him. As she lies dying, she poisons Lex with a neurotoxin that erases all of his memories within 30 seconds.

After overhearing a government radio broadcast containing disguised references to nuclear weapons, Lois sneaks on board Air Force One. She manipulates her way into a room with the Secretary of State, where she tells him that the supposed meteor is really a planet, and that the heroes they tried to destroy can save them. They agree to give the heroes a chance, but give them only five minutes. In the Kent barn, Clark is attacked by Darkseid, who is possessing Lionel's body. Jor-El taps into Clark's thoughts, showing him images of his trials over the past ten years, revealing that his entire life has been one big trial leading to this moment. Harnessing the ability to fly, Clark smashes through Lionel's body, destroying it, and makes his way to the Fortress of Solitude. There, the spirit of his father Jonathan presents him with the suit Martha made for him, and Clark takes to the sky, saving a crashing Air Force One, and vanquishing Darkseid by pushing Apokolips back into space.

Seven years later, Chloe finishes her bedside story and puts her son to sleep. She then calls Lois at the Daily Planet, who meets Jimmy Olsen's now grown-up brother outside Perry White's office. While they rush off to work, a TV broadcast announces that Lex has been elected the President of the United States. Clark pretends to run clumsily into Lois on the stairs and they discuss finally getting married after seven years. News arrives of a bomb found in an elevator uptown, and Clark excuses himself and runs to the rooftop, ripping open his shirt and revealing the Superman logo on his suit.

== Production ==
=== Background and writing ===
Following the conclusion of the seventh season finale "Arctic", showrunners and original series developers Alfred Gough and Miles Millar left the series. This meant that they were unable to write the series finale, although Millar later noted that, in their minds, "the last moment of the show would have been him [Clark Kent] putting on the suit and flying off into his future and his destiny". According to executive producer and showrunner Kelly Souders, she and fellow executive producer and showrunner Brian Peterson kept Gough and Millar's original ending in mind when they began working on the finale, because the scenes that Gough and Millar had envisioned represented "real wish fulfillments for fans". The resultant script changed along the way, with Souders eventually calling it "a smorgasbord of what everybody wanted".

"Kelly and I split up the script, and I happened to get the very last few minutes. I was writing, 'Fade out'—that was a pretty major moment. I was sitting in the same place that I wrote my first script. It was an amazing personal and professional moment that all culminated with that one period".
—Brian Peterson, discussing finishing the script for the finale.

The first part of the episode was written by Al Septien and Turi Meyer, whereas the second half was written by Peterson and Souders. Due to the important nature of the episode, Septien, Meyer, Peterson, and Souders began working on the script before Christmas, in the fall of 2010, after the writers had a general idea for the first part of the tenth season episodes. Souders later explained that the script had been finalized when former series regular Michael Rosenbaum agreed to return in the role of Lex Luthor. As such, this forced the writers to redo parts of the episode to make room for his character. The work was so stressful, Souders said, that she experienced heart palpitations due to exhaustion, excitement, and the emotion of the experience.

The episode finally features Clark flying. Peterson and Souders had toyed with the idea of showing Clark flying in either the 200th episode, "Homecoming", or during a different mid-season episode, but they decided against it; they argued that Clark flying was a metaphor for him finally embracing his destiny, and that adding it to another episode other than the finale would be jarring. The writers listened to both network executive and fans in order to formulate the best idea as to how to handle the situation. Peterson noted that people wanted "one big transformation". According to Souders, the writers initially wished to include more members of the Justice League but, because of budgetary constraints, these ideas did not come to pass. Peterson, however, noted that the episode contained "80 to 90 percent of what everyone [wanted]". After the scripts were finished, they were heat-marked to ensure secrecy. According to Tom Welling, scripts could not be photocopied and, in order to read them, the actors had to sign them in and out.

=== Casting ===
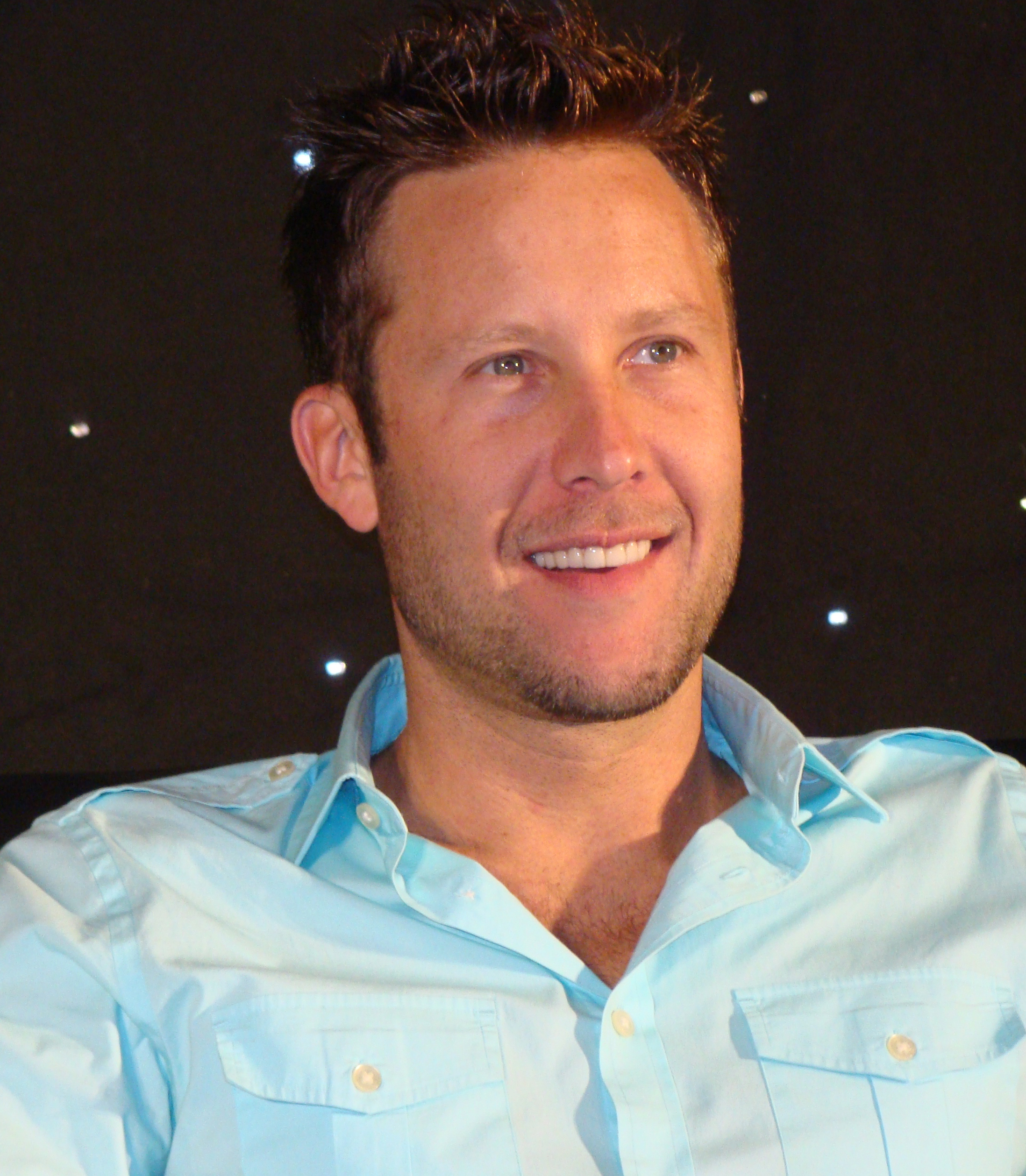
There was speculation about former star Michael Rosenbaum returning for the finale; he ultimately reprised his role as Lex Luthor.

The finale episodes featured several returning characters. John Schneider reprised his role as Jonathan Kent, appearing to Clark in various visions and presenting Clark with his suit near the end of the episode. Schneider's appearance was meant to bookend the season, with his role in the finale mirroring his appearance to Clark in the season premiere "Lazarus". Aaron Ashmore returned after his original character, Henry James Olsen, was killed in the eighth season episode "Doomsday". In the finale, Ashmore portrays Jimmy Olsen, Henry James' younger brother, in a sequence set seven years into the future. An uncredited Michael McKean also reprised his role as Perry White (although only his voice is heard in the episode), and former series regulars Annette O'Toole and Allison Mack were also featured.

The airing of the finale was preceded by months of speculation as to whether Rosenbaum would return. Welling stated that he was doing everything to get Rosenbaum back, because Rosenbaum was the only person Welling could have seen portraying Lex in the series. Before the airing of season ten commenced, Welling argued that, for him, Lex's return would have to be the inspiration for Clark to finally become Superman, because the idea of one character without the other was unthinkable.

At the 2010 Comic-Con, Welling stated that Rosenbaum acknowledged the importance of Lex in the series and wanted to return in some degree for the final season, but that he needed to finalize the details. Welling said that the tenth season teased Lex's return with the introduction of bodies into which Lex could tap in order to heal himself later in life. After months of speculation, he finally agreed to appear in the finale and Rosenbaum said it was for the fans. Had Rosenbaum not elected to return, Souders explained that Lex still would have played a part, but would have been more of "a puppeteer behind the scenes" and the fact that he was still living would have "been a reveal at the end of the show", sans the dialogue.

Speculation also surrounded whether former series star Kristin Kreuk would reprise her role as Lana Lang. Prior to the episode's broadcast, Kreuk ignited a minor controversy by noting that she would not be watching the episode when it aired, giving some fans the impression that she was avoiding the series. Kreuk released a statement on her Facebook page, clarifying that, even when she was a star on Smallville, she did not watch the episodes when they aired. Kreuk stated that Peterson and Souders never approached her about being in the finale, and that she was glad that they had not, because she was fond of how Lana's story arc ended in season eight.

=== Filming ===
Because the finale encompassed two separate episodes, each was filmed by a different director. Part one was directed by Kevin G. Fair, and the second part was directed by Greg Beeman. Beeman had been a regular director for the series during its first five years, but he had left after helping direct the fifth season episode "Reckoning". A fan of the series himself, he was particularly pleased with the way in which the various story arcs were wrapped up, highlighting the scenes in the Fortress of Solitude, the seven-year flashforward, and Schneider's reappearance. Production for the finale started in March 2011. The producers for the series were initially concerned that they had not filmed enough material to fill the finale's allotted air time, so additional scenes were filmed between Granny Goodness and Gordon Godfrey concerning the Darkseid mythology. A rough cut of the finished episodes ended up going over time however, and the scenes were cut. There was talk that these scenes would appear on the tenth season DVD, although this did not come to pass.

The suit that Clark dons in the series finale was originally used in the film Superman Returns (2006), worn by Brandon Routh. The producers of Smallville had been offered the suit worn by Christopher Reeve in the original Superman films, but they turned the offer down. Peterson reasoned that this was because it "didn't quite fit with our world". The final scene was shot to be reminiscent of the similar scene in the film Superman (1978), where Reeve rips open his shirt to reveal the Superman suit. Beeman and the rest of the production staff reviewed the scene to make sure that they filmed the homage correctly, but Beeman later noted that the iconic scene was "clunkier" and more "out of focus" than they wanted, and that people's memories make it seem more impressive. He was ultimately pleased that the recreated shot was the sequence to wrap up Smallville, noting that he "always thought that was going to be the final moment".

Special effects for the finale episodes—and series as a whole—were completed by Entity FX. The company produced nearly 80 different visual effects shots for the episode, which were created in the Entity FX facilities in Vancouver, British Columbia, Canada, and Santa Monica, California, with addition supervision in Vancouver. Mat Beck, owner of the company, later explained that the company was in charge of "work[ing] this magic" on several minutes of screen time, during which hardly any photography had been filmed. The episode also made use of practical effects, such as how Lex's bald head was created. Unlike Rosenbaum's previous appearances, the actor decided to opt for a bald cap to cover his hair, arriving at this decision both because it had taken four months for his hair to grow back and because he was working on other projects that required him to have hair.

The final five minutes of the second part featured the musical score for the Krypton sequence in the opening credits of Superman (1978), orchestrated by John Williams. Former series composer Mark Snow, who served from seasons one to six, had previously reworked the score in season two's "Rosetta"—which featured a guest appearance by Reeve—as well as various moments in the season two finale, "Exodus".

== Broadcast ==
=== Ratings ===
The double-episode finale earned a Nielsen rating of 1.8, with a 3 share in the 18- to 49-year-old demographic. Nielsen ratings are audience measurement systems that determine the audience size and composition of television programming in the United States. These ratings mean that the two-episode finale was seen by 1.8 percent of all 18- to 49-year-olds, and 3 percent of all 18- to 49-year-olds watching television at the time of the broadcast. It was viewed by an estimated 3.35 million viewers, and ranked second in its timeslot. For the first one-and-a-half hours, the episode averaged around 2.9 million viewers, but during the final 30 minutes, viewership rose to 3.39 million. The ratings for the final episode marked a 63 percent increase when compared with the previous episode, "Prophecy".

=== Reception ===
Jeff Jensen of Entertainment Weekly's PopWatch complimented the episode, writing that "the series finale of Smallville did what it needed to do: It completed the circuit on an epic coil of story that began 10 years ago". Jensen was critical of the first half of the episode, noting that the pre-marital tension between Clark and Lois did not bode well for the story, but felt that the last 10 minutes made up for the slow parts in the episode. He ultimately concluded that the finale was "radically cornball and goosebumpingly geektastic, and the fanboy in me was satisfied". Chris Carabott of IGN awarded the episode a 9.5 out of 10, citing an "amazing" episode. He argued that it "succeeded in delivering the moments we wanted to see" and that "this finale delivered some of the most memorable moments of the series and successfully transformed Clark Kent into Superman". Nick McHatton of TV Fanatic awarded the episode five stars out of five, calling its resolution "breath taking". McHatton praised the ending, noting that "I couldn't have asked for a better ending than those seven years in the future" and that the final shot was the scene he "always imagined Smallville could end with".

The actual shots of Superman were met with criticism, due to the fact that Welling was never seen in a full-body shot, and because many of the scenes, such as this one, were rendered completely via CGI.

Mike Moody of AOLTV felt that the season finale alternated between "exciting and disappointing", with the final 15 minutes being particularly good due to the celebration of "what we love most about Clark Kent/Superman – his power to delight and inspire us". Moody was critical that the substantial scenes in the episode were surrounded by "countless minutes of poorly paced padding, filler, and manufactured conflict", and that "the bulk of this two-hour finale was just painful to watch". Phil Dyess-Nugent of The A.V. Club awarded the episode a "C+" and called it "a sodden mess that mostly points up how off-balance the show became". He heavily criticized the show for focusing so much of the romance between Clark and Lois, and wrote that it detracted from the "better" plot concerning Darkseid and his minions.

Likewise, several reviewers expressed frustration with the lack of a full-body shot of Clark in the Superman suit, as well as the way in which Superman was presented as flying through the use of CGI. TVLine ranked the fact that Clark Kent "barely suits up" in the finale as one of "TV's 20 Biggest Disappointments of 2011", writing that "we never quite were treated to seeing the series star clad in the full costume, in flying mode", although they wrote that it was "a super-nitpick". Carabott called the CGI effects "a little shoddy", but that they made up "one of the most important moments of the series". Peterson and Souders, however, were reportedly "thrilled" by the "great debate", noting that "what [the producers] wanted to do all along was show hints at where he was going, because Clark's destiny as Superman is a whole different story that is yet to be told".

Rosenbaum's return as Lex Luthor was met with positive critical reception. Jensen felt that Rosenbaum's cameo was too short, but that it was worth it to see him play Lex one last time. Carabott felt that the scene between Lex and Clark was "worth the wait". Dyess-Nugent praised Rosenbaum's acting, arguing that it shook "the show awake, sending the needle hurtling rudely into the red zone". He ultimately stated that Rosenbaum's acting—in both the finale and the series as a whole—was "one of the great TV series performances of the past 10 years and proof once again that talent will blossom in the least expected places".
