= Where We Belong (novel) =

2012 novel by Emily Giffin

- First edition cover of the 2012 hardback
- Author: Emily Giffin
- Language: English
- Genre: Drama, Chick-lit
- Publisher: St. Martin's Press
- Publication date: July 24, 2012
- Publication place: United States
- Media type: Print (Hardback & e-book)
- Pages: 384 pp (first edition, hardback)
- ISBN: 0312554192 (first edition, hardback)

Where We Belong is a 2012 New York Times bestselling chick-lit novel by Emily Giffin. The novel was released by St. Martin's Press on July 24, 2012. Where We Belong has been optioned to become a film, with Giffin serving as producer. The book is narrated partly through the perspective of Kirby Rose, and is Giffin's first novel with a teenager as a main character.

== Synopsis ==
Marian always thought that she was living the life she wanted, with no true regrets. When Kirby Rose, the child she gave up eighteen years ago, appears on her doorstep Marian is forced to re-examine her life, her family, and a past romance that threatens to overwhelm her.

== Reception ==
Reception for Where We Belong has been mixed to positive, with the Chicago Sun-Times calling it an easy read while criticizing the book's predictability. The Seattle Times and Vancouver Sun both overall praised the novel, with the Vancouver Sun calling Giffin a "gifted storyteller".
