= Traditional rhyme =

Traditional poem with unknown author

A traditional rhyme is generally a saying, sometimes a proverb or an idiom, couched in the form of a rhyme and often passed down from generation to generation with no record of its original authorship. Many nursery rhymes may be counted as traditional rhymes.

Examples of a traditional rhyme include the historically significant Ring Around the Rosie, the doggerel love poem Roses Are Red, and the wedding rhyme Something old, something new.

However, traditional rhymes are not necessarily ancient. As an example, the schoolchildren's rhyme commonly noting the end of a school year, "no more pencils, no more books, no more teacher's dirty looks," seems to be found in literature no earlier than the 1930s—though the first reference to it in that decade, in a 1932 magazine article, deems it, "the old glad song that we hear every spring."
