= Something New =

Something new may refer to:

== Film and television ==
- Something New (film), a 2006 romantic comedy
- Something New (How I Met Your Mother)
- "Something New", a 2007 episode of Brothers & Sisters
- Something New, a 1920 silent film starring Nell Shipman

== Music ==
=== Albums ===
- Something New (Beatles album), 1964
- Something New (Sam Jones album), 1979
- Something New (EP), a 2018 mini album by Taeyeon
- Something New (2025 EP), a 2025 EP by John Hartrampf

=== Songs ===
- "Something New" (Axwell & Ingrosso song), 2014
- "Something New" (Girls Aloud song), 2012
- "Something New" (Nikki Yanofsky song), 2014
- "Something New" (Wiz Khalifa song), 2017
- "Something New" (Zendaya song), 2016
- "Something New", by Dance Gavin Dance from Instant Gratification, 2015
- "Something New", by Hanson from MMMBop, 1996
- "Something New", by K. Michelle from All Monsters Are Human, 2020
- "Something New", by Set it Off, 2016
- "Something New", by Tokio Hotel from Dream Machine, 2016

== Other uses ==
- Something Fresh, a novel by P. G. Wodehouse first published in the U.S. as Something New
- Something New (political party), a political party in the United Kingdom

== See also ==
- Something (disambiguation)
- Something Blue (disambiguation)
- Something Borrowed (disambiguation)
- Something old
