= The Velours =

American R&B vocal group

- Also known as: The Troubadours
- Origin: Brooklyn, New York, U.S.
- Genre: Doo-wop
- Years active: 1953–1961; 1966–1967
- Labels: Onyx, Cub, Gone, End, MGM
- Past members: Jerome Ramos; John Cheatdom; Marvin Holland; Sammy Gardner; Kenneth Walker; Donald Haywoode; John Pearson; Charles Moffitt; Calvin McClean; Troy Keyes; Richard Pitts

The Fantastics
- Also known as: The Fabulous Temptations
- Origin: Brooklyn, New York, U.S.
- Genres: Doo-wop, pop
- Years active: 1968–late 1980s
- Labels: MGM, Deram, Bell
- Past members: Jerome Ramos; John Cheatdom; Donald Haywoode; Richard Pitts; Elvin Hayes; Emma St. John

The Velours were an American R&B vocal group. who had two minor pop hits in the US in the late 1950s, "Can I Come Over Tonight" and "Remember". They relocated to England in the late 1960s, changed their name to The Fantastics, and had a top ten hit in the UK in 1971 with "Something Old, Something New", followed by a minor US hit with "(Love Me) Love the Life I Lead".

== The Velours - origins and early career in the US ==
The group originally formed as The Troubadours in the Bedford-Stuyvesant area of Brooklyn in 1953. The original members were Jerome "Romeo" Ramos (tenor; May 15, 1937 – October 21, 2012), John Cheatdom (tenor; born 1938), Marvin Holland (bass) and Sammy Gardner (lead). In 1955, Gardner left to join the army and was replaced by Cheatdom's cousin, Kenneth Walker. The doo-wop group performed locally, but with little success until in 1956 they added a fifth singer, tenor Donald Haywoode (August 24, 1936 – August 9, 2015), and changed their name to The Velours. They made their first recordings for the Onyx label, before Holland and Walker left and were replaced by John Pearson and Charles Moffitt (September 6, 1929 – December 1986). They also added a pianist, Calvin McClean.

Over the next two years they made some of their best-remembered records for Onyx, including "Can I Come Over Tonight", written by Haywoode, which reached number 83 on the Billboard pop chart in 1957. They had further chart success the following year with "Remember", with Ramos as lead vocalist, which again reached number 83. The group also recorded an LP, Remember with the Velours. They regularly performed at the Apollo Theater, and shared stages with such stars as Roy Brown, Fats Domino, Larry Williams and Bo Diddley. After adding a sixth singer, Troy Keyes, they recorded for several small New York labels through the late 1950s and early 1960s, including George Goldner's Gone, but with little success, and the original group disbanded in 1961. In 1966, Ramos, Cheatdom and Haywoode decided to reform the Velours, adding tenor Richard Pitts. In 1967, they released the single "I'm Gonna Change" on MGM Records, and agreed to undertake a tour in England.

== The Fantastics - career in Britain ==
When they arrived in Britain, they discovered that they were to be billed as The Fabulous Temptations, and were expected to perform Motown songs. However, they toured successfully and were invited to return, in 1968, by Sheffield club owner Peter Stringfellow, this time under another new name, The Fantastics. They decided to remain in Britain, and recorded several singles released on MGM and then on the Deram label in England. They then signed to Bell Records, and released "Something Old, Something New", a song written and produced by top British songwriters Tony Macaulay, Roger Greenaway, and Roger Cook, based on a traditional rhyme. The song rose to number 9 on the UK singles chart in 1971, and reached number 102 in the US and number 41 in Australia.

Although its follow-ups were less successful, the group remained a popular live attraction in Britain for several years, though with several personnel changes. In 1972, they recorded "(Love Me) Love the Life I Lead", written by Macaulay and Greenaway and produced by Greenaway, which reached number 86 on the US Billboard pop chart, but did not chart in Britain. Pitts left in 1972, later becoming a lecturer at the University of Huddersfield, as well as working with another vocal group, The Invitations. Pitts' role in The Fantastics was part of a BBC Radio Four documentary by his son, the journalist and photographer Johny Pitts entitled 'Something Old Something New', named after the group's hit record. Both Ramos and Cheatdom also left in the mid-1970s, leaving Donald Haywoode as the only original member. By 1986, the Fantastics were still performing in Britain, on the nightclub and cabaret circuit, as a trio comprising Haywoode, Elvin Hayes, and Emma St. John.

== Later line-ups ==
In the late 1970s, Charles Moffitt formed a new group, Charles Moffitt and His Velours. The lead singer was Eulis Mason, who continued the group name after Moffitt was shot dead in an argument in 1986. Charles Moffitt's Velours, featuring Eulis Mason, continued to perform and occasionally record into the 1990s.

Remaining in Britain, John Cheatdom formed The Realistics in 1976. The group broke up in 1983, and Cheatdom then joined various unofficial line-ups of the Platters, sometimes called the Magic Platters, who toured internationally. Cheatdom published his autobiography in 2018, entitled Keeping Doo Wop Alive.

== Deaths ==
Jerome Ramos died from throat cancer in 2012, aged 75. Donald Haywoode died in England after a long illness in 2015, aged 78. John Pearson also died in 2016. After appearing in the BBC Radio 4 documentary Something Old, Something New in 2015 with his son Johny Pitts, Richie Pitts died in 2019.
