= Glorious Godfrey =

- Glorious Godfrey as depicted in The Forever People #7 (March 1972). Art by Jack Kirby.

Publication information
- Publisher: DC Comics
- First appearance: The Forever People #3 (June 1971)
- Created by: Jack Kirby (writer-artist)

In-story information
- Alter ego: Glorious Gordon Godfrey
- Species: New God
- Place of origin: Apokolips
- Team affiliations: Darkseid's Elite; Galaxy Communications
- Notable aliases: G. Gordon Godfrey, Reverend G. Godfrey Goode, Godfrey
- Abilities: Immortality; Superhuman physical attributes; Vocal mind-control; Commands the Army called The Justifiers

Glorious Godfrey is a DC Comics supervillain who is part of The Fourth World series of comic books in the early 1970s. He is a New God from Apokolips and a servant of Darkseid who masquerades as a human television personality.

Godfrey has been adapted into various media outside comics, primarily in association with the New Gods. Enrico Colantoni and Tim Curry voice the character in Justice League and Young Justice respectively, while Michael Daingerfield and Tom Cavanagh portray Godfrey in Smallville and Superman & Lois.

== Publication history ==
Glorious Godfrey first appeared in The Forever People #3 (June 1971) and was created by Jack Kirby.

In 1971, an article in The New York Times Magazine about "relevant comics" described "a handsome toothy character named Glorious Godfrey, a revivalist. Godfrey is drawn to look like an actor playing Billy Graham in a Hollywood film biography of Richard Nixon starring George Hamilton". The character was intended to embody the powerful, charismatic speaker who could talk people into justifying violence and evil.

Jack Kirby biographer Mark Evanier states that Glorious Godfrey was based on Billy Graham, with elements of Arthur Godfrey. Kirby was disturbed by Graham's antisemitic views and apocalyptic sermons, which instilled fear rather than faith.

== Fictional character biography ==
Godfrey and his sister Amazing Grace are members of Darkseid's Elite who possess similar mind control powers.

In his first appearance, Godfrey confronts the Forever People, who had stumbled upon a recruitment program for Earth-based warriors for Darkseid, and almost kills one of their members, Serifan. Despite the efforts of the Forever People's semi-sentient Super-Cycle, Godfrey's attack would have succeeded in killing Serifan; however, Highfather chose at that moment to recall all his people (and the cycle) home via teleportation.

Godfrey as depicted in Legends #4 (February 1987). Art by John Byrne.

In Legends, Darkseid attempts to deprive the world of its heroes, not only so that they would be ineffective against Darkseid, but also in the hopes that the people of Earth would more willingly surrender to his rule. The first phase of the plan consists of creating immense collateral damage by sending creatures to Earth to fight the superheroes. The public begins to resent the heroes in their midst, and therefore Darkseid starts the second phase of his plan by sending the master manipulator Glorious Godfrey to Earth. Assuming the identity of G. Gordon Godfrey (a reference to G. Gordon Liddy), he starts a hate campaign against the superheroes that proves to be very effective, riling the public and ultimately leading to a presidential decision to outlaw any super-heroic activity. The final phase of the plan consists of the Apokoliptian warhounds, cybernetic creatures that are bonded to human hosts, for which Godfrey is able to find an ample number of 'volunteers' among his hypnotized public. He leads his charges to Washington D.C., only to be confronted by a cadre of assembled heroes. He obtains Doctor Fate's helmet, but it wipes his mind and leaves him an empty shell.

In Final Crisis, Godfrey possesses human reverend Godfrey Good. Godfrey is present when Darkseid possesses Dan Turpin's body. However, Darkseid responds to his minion's impending death (presumably because Godfrey's host body was not modified to successfully contain Godfrey's essence) by watching them die in front of him. A one-shot revealed that Godfrey had been chosen by Darkseid to be Libra's assistant. The man is given generic technology to support him throughout the years because Darkseid believed the man had potential for greatness. Godfrey's assistance turns out to be invaluable, as Libra is the key to Darkseid's defeat of Earth.

In 2011, The New 52 rebooted the DC universe. Glorious Godfrey makes his first appearance by giving greetings to Batman and Ra's al Ghul from Apokolips. He has a new look, sporting a beard and an all-black uniform with red gloves and belt. Glorious Godfrey's reason for coming to Earth is to retrieve the Chaos Shard, a powerful crystal which once belonged to Darkseid which Ra's al Ghul revealed was hidden inside the sarcophagus he crafted for Damian Wayne. After detecting a trace signature of the shard coming from inside Damian's body, and despite the assistance of the Justice League, Glorious Godfrey escapes with the corpse back to Apokolips, with Batman vowing to get Damian's corpse back.

== Powers and abilities ==
As a New God, Godfrey is nigh-immortal and possesses superhuman physical abilities. However, he is a poor fighter and relies on his persuasive abilities. He possesses a prominent, albeit limited, ability to spur people with the power of his words. The control that Godfrey can exert over others through his dialect is imperfect, but potent enough to push others into acting in his favor.

== In other media ==
=== Television ===
- G. Gordon Godfrey appears in the Justice League two-part episode "Eclipsed", voiced by Enrico Colantoni. This version is the host of a sensationalist talk show that he uses to attack the Justice League's credibility. After the Justice League defeat Eclipso, Godfrey's sponsors drop him and his show is moved to an undesirable time slot of 4 AM.
- Gordon Godfrey appears in the tenth season of Smallville, portrayed by Michael Daingerfield. This version is a human shock jock who attacks vigilantes, superheroes, and illegal aliens. After being possessed by Darkseid, he writes a best-selling book discrediting superheroes in the hopes of sowing mistrust and doubt and making Earth's population lose faith in their heroes. Lois Lane tries to expose Godfrey, but Darkseid fully takes over his body and tortures Lane to lure Clark Kent to him before he is separated from Darkseid. Godfrey later meets with Granny Goodness and DeSaad in an attempt to use the brainwashed Oliver Queen to remove Kent's powers with gold kryptonite. However, Kent frees Queen who confronts and kills Godfrey, Goodness and DeSaad.
- G. Gordon Godfrey appears in Young Justice, voiced by Tim Curry in the second season and by James Arnold Taylor in the third season. This version is a xenophobic news show host.
- Gordon Godfrey appears in the Superman & Lois episode "Sharp Dressed Man", portrayed by Tom Cavanagh. This version is the host of the GODFREY! talk show in Metropolis.

=== Film ===
G. Gordon Godfrey appears in Reign of the Supermen, voiced by an uncredited Trevor Devall. This version is an editorialist who wrote an article on how Earth's people need to be their own heroes instead of relying on metahumans.

=== Video games ===
G. Gordon Godfrey appears as a character summon in Scribblenauts Unmasked: A DC Comics Adventure.
