= Smallville season 10 =

Final season of television series

Smallville
- Season 10
- DVD and Blu-ray cover featuring star Tom Welling
- Showrunners: Brian Peterson; Kelly Souders
- Starring: Tom Welling; Erica Durance; Cassidy Freeman; Justin Hartley; Allison Mack
- No. of episodes: 22

Release
- Original network: The CW
- Original release: September 24, 2010 – May 13, 2011

Season chronology
- ← Previous; Season 9 Next → –

The tenth and final season of Smallville, an American television series developed by Alfred Gough and Miles Millar, premiered on September 24, 2010 on The CW. The series recounts the early adventures of Kryptonian Clark Kent as he adjusts to life in the fictional town of Smallville, Kansas, during the years before he becomes Superman. The tenth season comprises 22 episodes and concluded its initial airing on May 13, 2011. Regular cast members during season ten include Tom Welling, Erica Durance, Cassidy Freeman, Justin Hartley, and Allison Mack.

The final season of the series continues the romance developed between Clark (Welling) and Lois Lane (Durance), as well as the continuation of Clark's trials and the forging of his superhero identity "Superman". Former series regulars John Schneider, Annette O'Toole, John Glover, Laura Vandervoort, and Callum Blue all returned sporadically throughout the season as Jonathan Kent, Martha Kent, Lionel Luthor, Kara, and Zod respectively, while Michael Rosenbaum (Lex Luthor) and Aaron Ashmore (Jimmy Olsen) returned for the series finale.

The season premiere was seen by 2.98 million U.S. viewers. By the end of this season, Smallville had become the longest running science fiction television series in North America.

== Episodes ==
No. overall	No. in season	Title	Directed by	Written by	Original release date	Prod. code	U.S. viewers (millions)
196	1	"Lazarus"	Kevin G. Fair	Don Whitehead & Holly Henderson	September 24, 2010	3X6001	2.98
Lois removes the blue kryptonite dagger from Clark's body and hides as he heals. Chloe uses Doctor Fate's helmet to see her future and later swaps herself for Oliver's return from captivity before his captor Rick Flag (Ted Whittall). Tess wakes up healed in Cadmus Labs and discovers Lex Luthor clones. An older clone, "LX-13" (Mackenzie Gray), escapes and forces Clark to choose between saving Lois or Metropolis; Clark pushes himself harder than before and saves everyone. LX-13 succumbs to clone degeneration. Jor-El (voiced by Terence Stamp) informs Clark that the darkness within himself will make him Earth's greatest threat, but a vision of his adoptive father Jonathan Kent (John Schneider) reminds Clark that he can still be the world's greatest hero. Meanwhile, Lois decides to take the reporting position in Africa and Tess unofficially adopts a child clone of Lex, "LX-15" (Jacob Davies), who names himself "Alexander".
197	2	"Shield"	Glen Winter	Jordan Hawley	October 1, 2010	3X6002	2.38
Lois takes a Daily Planet field reporter position in Egypt, so Clark sends Carter Hall (Michael Shanks) to look after her. Subsequently, Carter and Lois discuss her running away from Clark in order to protect his secret. Oliver discovers that Chloe erased all records of herself before she disappeared, so he sets out to track her down. He discovers that she traded her life for his and afterward faked her own death during the interrogation to escape. Meanwhile, Clark is assigned a new partner, Cat Grant (Keri Lynn Pratt), who hates all superheroes. Flag tags Clark, Oliver, and Carter with special trackers embedded in their skin. After protecting Cat from the assassin Deadshot (Bradley Stryker), Clark decides not to go after Lois in Africa and begins wearing a new red and blue version of his costume. Flag and Plastique (Jessica Parker Kennedy) spring Deadshot from his holding cell as Flag assembles the Suicide Squad.
198	3	"Supergirl"	Mairzee Almas	Anne Cofell Saunders	October 8, 2010	3X6003	2.30
Radio personality Gordon Godfrey (Michael Daingerfield) becomes possessed by the dark force Clark was warned about, and begins waging a crusade against all superheroes. Kara (Laura Vandervoort) comes back to Earth and tells Clark that Jor-El has sent her to take care of the evil that is coming, as the doubt in Clark's heart will allow it to possess him and use Clark's powers as the ultimate weapon. Lois returns from Africa and learns that Godfrey is planning to reveal Green Arrow's identity and create doubt all over the world about the superheroes so that he can manipulate them down a new path. Clark and Kara confront Godfrey, and Kara's Kryptonian bracelet exorcises the entity from Godfrey. Oliver decides it is best everyone knows the truth and reveals his identity as Green Arrow.
199	4 (Note: The producers consider season nine's "Absolute Justice" two separately produced episodes, but The CW combined those two episodes into a single broadcast, and then packaged it in the season nine DVD as one episode as well. Therefore, "Absolute Justice" is both the 185th and 186th episode produced, but only the 185th episode aired. Thus, "Homecoming" is considered the 200th episode produced, but the 199th broadcast. The CW recognizes "Homecoming" to be the 200th episode.)	"Homecoming"	Jeannot Szwarc	Brian Peterson & Kelly Souders	October 15, 2010	3X6004	3.19
Clark and Lois attend their five-year high school reunion, which triggers memories of Lana Lang and Chloe. Brainiac 5 (James Marsters) arrives from the 31st century. After wiping the grudge of a school counselor (Chilton Crane) who blames Clark for some of the Kryptonite-infected students being on the wrong side of the law, Braniac 5 takes Clark on a journey through his past, present, and future. Brainiac shows Clark that he still blames himself for Jonathan's death, he is abandoning his friends in the present, and that his fear of his own future is unfounded. After seeing that his future can be exactly how he hopes, Clark returns to the present and sees how a reformed Greg Arkin (Chad Donella) tells Lois to thank Clark for helping him. After supporting Oliver in his venture to reveal his identity to the world, Clark rebuilds his relationship with Lois by giving her the attention she deserves and finally admitting that he loves her.
200	5	"Isis"	James Marshall	Genevieve Sparling	October 22, 2010	3X6005	2.60
Clark contemplates telling Lois his secret, while Lois also decides to reveal to Clark that she already knows he is the Blur. Before either can say anything, Lois unwittingly becomes possessed by the Egyptian goddess Isis, who sets out to resurrect her long lost lover Osiris. Clark and Oliver look to Tess for help in trying to stop Isis, as Osiris's return will unleash Hell on Earth. Clark sets out to stop Isis, but instead almost becomes the vessel for Osiris before Oliver arrives and informs Clark on how to defeat the goddess. Using his heat vision on Isis' amulet, Clark successfully releases Lois from possession. Afterward, Clark and Oliver invite Tess to be part of their team and take over Watchtower. Later, Clark finally tells Lois that he is the Blur.
201	6	"Harvest"	Turi Meyer	Al Septien & Turi Meyer	October 29, 2010	3X6007	2.96
Clark and Lois get a flat tire in the middle of nowhere, so Clark goes to the nearby town to fix the tire while Lois stays behind with a young girl named Charlotte Cavanaugh (Bella King). Charlotte takes Lois to a village where the water supply has been contaminated with blue kryptonite. Clark returns to find Lois missing and sets out to look for her. Lois discovers Charlotte, her parents Joseph (Ron Lea) and Ruth (Merrilyn Gann), and the rest of the villagers are planning to sacrifice her to bring continued good crops and health. She and Clark, who is powerless next to the villagers who emit blue kryptonite radiation, are captured. As a result of Lois's intervention, the villagers eventually move far enough from Clark that he transports himself and Lois back to Metropolis. Meanwhile, Tess realizes Alexander (Connor Stanhope) has all of Lex's memories and his evil personality, so she decides to stop Dr. Christina Lamell (Lexa Doig) from finding a cure for Alexander's accelerated growth.
202	7	"Ambush"	Christopher Petry	Holly Henderson & Don Whitehead	November 5, 2010	3X6006	2.63
General Sam Lane (Michael Ironside) and Lucy Lane (Peyton List) come into town to celebrate Thanksgiving with Lois and Clark. While visiting, the General reveals that he is a proponent of a new vigilante registration law, much to the dismay of Clark and Lois. Tess and Oliver discover that the team is being tracked by Flag, who is reforming the Suicide Squad with Emil LeSalle (Elias Toufexis) as its latest member. He has sent out an assassination order for the General. Flag launches a missile to kill the General, but it detonates next to Lois. The Blur saves Lois, which helps to change the General's opinion of some vigilantes. Regardless, the vigilante law passes and Flag begins ordering acts of terrorism on anti-vigilante headquarters after he and LeSalle get away.
203	8	"Abandoned"	Kevin G. Fair	Andrew Landis & Julia Swift	November 12, 2010	3X6008	2.90
Lois watches a video tape left by her deceased mother Ella (Teri Hatcher), who tells Lois not to let the loss of a loved one keep her from living up to her full potential. Subsequently, Lois goes to the Fortress and pleads with Jor-El to reconcile with Clark so that Clark can be the hero he needs to be. Meanwhile, Clark helps Tess uncover the truth about a dream Tess had about being in an orphanage, leading them to confront Granny Goodness (Christine Willes), who Tess was left with when she was five years old. After escaping from Granny Goodness, Clark finds Lois and sees an holographic message of Jor-El (Julian Sands) and Lara (Helen Slater) moments before Krypton's destruction. Granny Goodness reunites with club owner Desaad (Steve Byers) and Godfrey, all prophets for the dark lord Darkseid. Tess learns her birth name is Lutessa Lena Luthor, the illegitimate child of Lionel Luthor.
204	9	"Patriot"	Tom Welling	John Chisholm	November 19, 2010	3X6009	2.60
Oliver registers for the Vigilante Registration Act (VRA), being overseen by Col. Slade Wilson (Michael Hogan), in order to protect the rest of the team and find out what the government is planning. Oliver's suspicions are confirmed when the registration location is revealed to be a trap designed to locate and arrest superheroes. Clark teams up with Arthur Curry (Alan Ritchson), now aware of his Atlantean heritage, and Arthur's wife Mera (Elena Satine), to track down the superhero prisons the government has built. After the team rescues Oliver, Clark discovers that Slade's actions were influenced by Darkseid through an omega signature. Subsequently, Clark brings Lois onto the team and reveals the threat of Darkseid's arrival to Oliver and Tess.
205	10	"Luthor"	Kelly Souders	Bryan Q. Miller	December 3, 2010	3X6010	2.76
Clark learns that there is another Lex clone in existence and that Tess has been keeping him alive behind everyone's back. Clark also discovers that Tess has a Kryptonian box. When he activates it, it sends him to a parallel universe where the Luthors are his adoptive family and not the Kents. While on the alternate Earth, Clark learns that Tess is actually a Luthor, that his doppelganger goes by the alias Ultraman and murders anyone that gets in his way, including Lex. Clark acquires the Kryptonian box and manages to send himself back to his own reality, but unknowingly brings the alternate Lionel (John Glover) with him.
206	11	"Icarus"	Mairzee Almas	Genevieve Sparling	December 10, 2010	3X6011	2.55
Clark proposes marriage to Lois and she accepts. Shortly after their engagement party, Oliver is attacked by Metropolis citizens which sparks a manhunt for Queen and the rest of the heroes, including Carter and Courtney Whitmore (Britt Irvin). Realizing Slade is still alive, Clark orders all heroes underground until he can find a way to stop Slade. Soldiers bring in Emil Hamilton (Alessandro Juliani), Tess, and Lois for questioning to find out where the Blur is. Lois escapes but is found by Slade before being saved by Carter, who sacrifices his own life in the process. To stop Slade for good, Clark banishes him to the Phantom Zone. The heroes come together to bury Carter in his home country of Egypt, but are knocked unconscious by an unknown object that sprouts in Carter's burial chamber.
207	12	"Collateral"	Morgan Beggs	Jordan Hawley	February 4, 2011	3X6012	2.37
After being knocked unconscious at Carter's funeral, Clark and his friends wake up without their powers and flashbacks of Chloe experimenting on them in a secret lab. Chloe reappears and informs Oliver that the government has put everyone in a coma and imprisoned their minds in a virtual reality attempting to find a way to turn on and off the heroes' powers in the real world to ensure their cooperation with the VRA. She hacked into the program and is helping each hero back into reality. After initial distrust to her by Clark, he and Lois escape, while Chloe, Oliver, Dinah Lance (Alaina Huffman), Flag, and Deadshot stop the government agents in the real world. In the aftermath, Chloe tells to Clark she disappeared because Doctor Fate's helmet warned her about the attack and later blackmailed Flag into joining forces with her as a means of keeping the Suicide Squad from harming innocent lives.
208	13	"Beacon"	Michael Rohl	Holly Henderson & Don Whitehead	February 11, 2011	3X6013	2.32
Tess and Oliver discover that the alternate Lionel has taken over LuthorCorp under the guise that he faked his death years prior. Martha Kent (Annette O'Toole) holds an anti-VRA rally that results in her being shot by a spectator. Lionel finds the now teenage Alexander (Lucas Grabeel) in an abandoned building and discovers he shot Martha with the intention of killing Clark with kryptonite bullets. Martha confronts Lionel and Alexander at the Luthor mansion, but Alexander learns of the fate of Lex in Lionel's reality and sets fire to the mansion. Tess convinces Alexander to give up his quest for vengeance while Clark saves Martha and Lionel. Afterward, Clark and his friends watch as the VRA is repealed by voters thanks to support from people spread by Lois and Chloe. Tess attempts to kill Alexander, but discovers he has indestructible skin.
209	14	"Masquerade"	Tim Scanlan	Bryan Q. Miller	February 18, 2011	3X6014	2.22
As Clark makes more saves around the world, resulting in more exposure of his face, Lois suggests that he develop a better secret identity. Chloe and Oliver, and later Clark, discover the work of a serial killer in Metropolis and learn that he is Desaad. Chloe is kidnapped and tortured by Desaad but is saved by Clark before Desaad can turn her into a Darkseid follower. Clark also learns he is now capable of resisting Darkseid's influence thanks to his strong feelings for Lois. However, a confrontation between Oliver and Desaad leaves an unaware Oliver with an omega signature on his skull. Clark explains to Lois that his real identity is the Blur and that the persona of "Clark Kent" will be his true mask to the world. To accomplish this, Clark begins wearing eyeglasses and changing his mannerisms to be more mild-mannered.
210	15	"Fortune"	Christopher Petry	Anne Cofell Saunders	February 25, 2011	3X6015	2.56
Zatanna sends magical champagne to Clark and Lois's bachelor/bachelorette party, which causes everyone, including Chloe, Oliver, Tess, and Emil, to act out of character and afterward wipes their memory. As a result, Clark and Chloe wake up believing they are married, Emil is arrested for the theft of an armored truck, while Lois and Oliver wake up in the middle of nowhere with Lois's engagement ring missing. It is revealed that Emil was actually taken by casino owner Amos Fortune (James Kidnie), who was trying to steal the armored truck himself. Oliver and Lois discover that Lois lost her ring to Fortune in a rigged game of blackjack. Lois and Oliver retrieve the ring while Clark saves Emil from Fortune's henchmen. Afterward, everyone watch video footage from the previous night. Chloe announces that she is leaving for Star City, but Oliver reveals to Chloe they were the ones married and they leave together.
211	16	"Scion"	Al Septien	Turi Meyer & Al Septien	March 4, 2011	3X6016	2.18
Tess reveals to Clark that Alexander was genetically engineered from both Lex and Clark's DNA. Clark takes Alexander, now going by the name Conner, under his wing and attempts to teach him to control his powers. When Clark lies about where the other half of the DNA comes from, Conner flees and is found by Lionel who slips a red kryptonite ring on Conner's hand. Without his inhibitions, Conner's dark side comes out and he attempts to force Lois into loving him. Clark comes to the rescue and destroys the ring. Afterward, Conner returns home to the Kent farm and learns that Clark has enrolled him into Smallville High as "Conner Kent". Tess proves that Lionel is an imposter and retakes control over LuthorCorp. Lionel is visited by Darkseid.
212	17	"Kent"	Jeannot Szwarc	Story by : Genevieve Sparling; Teleplay by : Brian Peterson & Kelly Souders	April 15, 2011	3X6018	2.37
Martha gives Clark and Lois the deed to the family farm as an early wedding gift, and the two decide it is best to sell the farm and move to Metropolis. Meanwhile, Ultraman returns from the alternate universe and sends Clark in his place before destroying the gateway between the universes. Lois quickly discovers the truth and works with Emil to bring Clark back. Ultraman reveals himself to Tess and threatens to kill her if she does not help him find Lionel. Meanwhile, Clark finds the alternate Jonathan and convinces him of not being Ultraman before being successfully brought back by Lois and Emil. Clark saves Tess before Ultraman can kill her. Ultraman follows Clark to the Fortress, where Clark attempts to convince Ultraman to return to his universe and use his powers for good. Ultraman is sent back to his universe, where he is greeted by the alternate Jor-El.
213	18	"Booster"	Tom Welling	Geoff Johns	April 22, 2011	3X6017	2.35
While Lois helps Clark to develop a mild-mannered persona, superhero Booster Gold (Eric Martsolf) and his robot Skeets (voiced by Ross Douglas) show up from the future where Booster Gold tries to take the spotlight from the Blur. Clark confronts Booster and informs him that a true hero is not made by the suit they wear, but by who they are inside. Meanwhile, young teen Jaime Reyes (Jaren Brandt Bartlett), comes in contact with alien technology en route to Kord Industries that encases him in a weaponized robotic suit. Unable to control the suit, Jaime begins destroying property and injuring people. Booster recounts Clark's words to Jaime and helps him gain control over the suit. Kord Industries CEO Ted Kord (Sebastian Spence) offers to help remove the suit from Jaime only to be told by Jaime that he will use it to become a superhero. Afterward, Clark convinces Booster to mentor Jaime while Kord keeps Booster on his payroll.
214	19	"Dominion"	Justin Hartley	John Chisholm	April 29, 2011	3X6021	1.99
Tess informs Clark that Slade escaped the Phantom Zone. Clark and Oliver enter the Kryptonian prison to learn who has opened the portal. The two are captured by Phantom Zone inhabitants led by Kamira (Aliyah O'Brien) and an unnamed inhabitant (John DeSantis) where they are brought to Zod (Callum Blue). Zod reveals he was exiled by the Kandorians and that, upon entering the Phantom Zone, he merged with the Phantom of the original Zod and also met Darkseid, who helped him become the ruler of the prison. Zod reveals to Oliver he has the omega symbol, and then forces Oliver and Clark to fight to the death. When Zod attempts to kill Clark at the end of the fight, the pair steal back the key to the portal and return to Earth, destroying the key to ensure that Zod and his followers cannot escape. Afterward, Oliver sets out to find the bow of Orion with the hope that it will help them to defeat Darkseid.
215	20	"Prophecy"	Michael Rohl	Anne Cofell Saunders & Bryan Q. Miller	May 6, 2011	3X6019	2.07
Jor-El gives Lois all of Clark's powers, leaving him powerless, so that the two can see what it is like to live in each other's shoes for one day. After defeating a brainwashed Courtney, Clark and the team find an implant on her. They discover that the imprisoned Toyman (Chris Gauthier) is leading a group of supervillains in his Marionette Ventures organization. Lois receives the same implant that allows Toyman to control her and he sends her to kill the Blur. From his cell, Toyman contacts the Marionette Ventures members Roulette, Vordigan, Metallo, Black Manta, Captain Cold, and Solomon Grundy (John DeSantis) and has them pass their mission folders to one another where they are each assigned to go after someone. Roulette is assigned to go after Watchtower, Vordigan is assigned to go after Green Arrow, Metallo is assigned to go after Supergirl, Black Manta is assigned to go after Aquaman, Captain Cold is assigned to go after Flash, and Solomon Grundy is assigned to go after Black Canary. Toyman then tells them that once their "newest associate" takes out "Blur", the Metropolis aquifer will be theirs. Clark is able to regain his powers in time to stop Lois. Meanwhile, Oliver and Kara team up and locate Orion's bow. Before they can grab it, Jor-El calls Kara and sends her to forge her own destiny as Clark is ready to accept his on Earth; she leaves to the future with a Legion ring. Granny Goodness steals the bow from Oliver and destroys it. She sends an influenced Oliver after gold kryptonite. Clark is decided to accept his destiny and deactivates Jor-El. However, Lois calls off the wedding so Clark can save more people instead of spending time with her.
216	21	"Finale"	Kevin G. Fair	Al Septien & Turi Meyer	May 13, 2011	3X6020	3.02
217	22	"Finale"	Greg Beeman	Brian Peterson & Kelly Souders	May 13, 2011	3X6022	3.02
Part 1: Tess learns that the planet Apokolips is coming to Earth to destroy humanity. While verifying the threat, Tess discovers that Oliver is under Darkseid's possession. Desaad, Godfrey, and Granny Goodness supply Oliver with a ring made of gold kryptonite to give to Clark, as it will remove his powers permanently. During Clark and Lois' wedding, Chloe discovers the ring in time and keeps Clark from wearing it. Afterward, Clark helps Oliver to remove the omega symbol and Darkseid's control over him. Martha and Jonathan's manifestation help Clark understand he needs Jor-El's guidance to confront the threat. Part 2: Lionel kidnaps Tess in an effort to transplant her heart into Lex (Michael Rosenbaum), who is almost mended after grafting his body with his clones' vital parts, but Tess escapes. Darkseid arrives and Lionel trades his soul for Lex's life. Possessing Lionel, Darkseid confronts Clark, who finally realizes that Jor-El was preparing him for this his entire life. Clark accesses his power of flight and vanquishes Darkseid from Lionel's deceased body. A newly revived Lex kills Tess, but not before Tess uses a neurotoxin to erase all of Lex's memories. Clark goes to the Fortress and receives the suit Martha made for him before flying away to stop Apokolips from destroying Earth, bringing hope to humanity and breaking their connection to Darkseid. Seven years later, Chloe tells her and Oliver's son a Smallville comic book depicting Clark's story; Lex is President of the United States; Jimmy Olsen's younger brother (Aaron Ashmore) works at the Daily Planet under Perry White (voiced by an uncredited Michael McKean) alongside Clark and Lois, who are still trying to get married; and Clark has fully embraced his destiny as Superman.

== Cast and characters ==
=== Main ===
- Tom Welling as Clark Kent / The Blur / Superman
  - Welling also portrays Clark Luthor / Ultraman in two episodes
- Erica Durance as Lois Lane
  - Durance also portrays Earth-2 Lois in two episodes
- Cassidy Freeman as Tess Mercer (Note: Absent in five episodes)
  - Freeman also portrays Earth-2 Tess in "Luthor"
- Justin Hartley as Oliver Queen / Green Arrow
  - Hartley also portrays Earth-2 Oliver in "Luthor"
- Allison Mack as Chloe Sullivan (Note: Absent in 13 episodes. Uncredited for two episodes.)

=== Recurring ===
- Terence Stamp as the voice of Jor-El
- John Schneider as Jonathan Kent
- Ted Whittall as Rick Flag
- Alessandro Juliani as Dr. Emil Hamilton
- Keri Lynn Pratt as Cat Grant
- Michael Daingerfield as Gordon Godfrey
- Christine Willes as Granny Goodness
- Steve Byers as Desaad
- John Glover as Lionel Luthor (Earth-2)

== Production ==
=== Development ===
It's amazing to think that Chloe Sullivan and I have been one and the same for over a third of my life, I'm truly humbled by the love and loyalty of all the fans whose enthusiasm has carried me — along with a cast and crew that has become my second family — over the past nine and a half years. Out of respect for the amazingly loyal fans and the place I will always have in my own heart for Chloe, I'm coming back for several episodes next season to tie up Chloe's Smallville legacy properly. It's been a life-changing ride, and I look forward to what lies ahead with the strength of a 'superhero' as my foundation.

— Allison Mack on coming back for 9 more episodes of season 10. Smallville

In March 2010, The CW renewed Smallville for its tenth and final season, which consists of 22 episodes. Tom Welling, Erica Durance, Cassidy Freeman, Callum Blue, and Justin Hartley were the only regular cast members from the previous season who were contracted for the tenth season, although Blue was not picked up for the second year of his deal. As Allison Mack's contract was reportedly not renewed before the end of season nine, her status was in question, although executive producer Brian Peterson was "very optimistic" that Mack would return.

The studio's official press release was presented two months later and confirmed that Smallville would be remaining at its Friday, 8 p.m. time slot. It also revealed that Smallville would be reteaming with Supernatural, a series that was originally slotted just behind Smallville on Thursday nights for four seasons. The press release did not list Mack in the list of stars. Mack released a statement that month that she would not return as a series regular, but would return for multiple episodes to wind up her storyline, while Peterson stated that, despite her long absence and limited episode count, Mack would remain a series regular. Mack said that her hope was that the character of Chloe Sullivan will hold on to her integrity as the writers closed out her storyline. For the actress, watching as her character matured over the years—from sacrificing the things she wanted for the sake of her friends, to finally reaching a point where she can strive to satisfy her own needs and wants—has been important for her. Welling, who served as a part-time producer for season nine, was promoted as a full executive producer for season ten. Welling was also set to direct two episodes during the season, and Hartley was contracted to direct another episode.

=== Story ===
Peterson and executive producer Kelly Souders revealed that the theme for season ten was "facing the ghosts of your past and how [the effect of seeing the past] helps you move on in the future"; as such, the return of previous cast members played into this. Souders and Peterson also chose not to erase Lois Lane's memory of Clark Kent's secret, something she discovered in the season nine finale. Instead, Lois helped Clark do what he needs to do to get away and fulfill his destiny without telling him that she knows. The producers explained that there were "some twists and turns" before Lois tells Clark that she knows. Initially helping Clark and Oliver Queen at Watchtower, Tess Mercer discovers a secret from her past, and the season explores whether she ends on the side of good or bad. Chloe's ending was also told in a way that was fitting for the character. She "sacrifices" herself for Oliver, who has been informed that she was killed. As a result, Oliver spends much of the season looking for Chloe, trying to find who is behind her murder. In addition, Oliver is "literally and figuratively stripped down to his bare essence" early on this season.

Similar to season eight and nine, the tenth season introduced a new main villain, Darkseid, but producers said that it is a different incarnation than his DC Comics counterpart. They explained that Darkseid's presence is felt throughout the whole season, but that he does not actually appear until near the end, unlike in previous seasons where the main villain was present from the start. Instead, Darkseid's minions—Granny Goodness, Desaad, Glorious Godfrey (in the series Gordon Godfrey), and others to be named—appear throughout the season as the physical presence for Clark to battle. That said, Darkseid makes an appearance in the season premiere, digitally created to start with, but with "more solid forms" making a short appearance by the third episode. The plan was for Darkseid's presence to be established as he takes over the bodies of various characters. The executive producers also wanted to take a look at the history of Smallville's Clark in the 200th episode of the series, "Homecoming". According to Peterson, the episode explores the past, the present and the future.

When discussing how the series would end, Peterson stated that the creative team had multiple visions of the series finale since the show began. According to Peterson, there was the vision that series creators Alfred Gough and Miles Millar developed and shared with the team over the years. Then there was the vision that Peterson and the current set of executive producers had. The producer said that ultimately, the finale is a combination of all their visions that he believed would not disappoint anyone. In addition, the producers stated that they did not want to hold anything back for this season, and they gave the fans what they wanted to see.

=== Characters ===
With the season being the series' last, plans began to bring back previous cast members for at least one appearance. Welling expressed his interest in having Annette O'Toole (Martha Kent), John Schneider (Jonathan Kent), Michael Rosenbaum (Lex Luthor), Kristin Kreuk (Lana Lang), and Michael McKean (Perry White) return. Welling even stated that he was doing everything to get Rosenbaum back. For Welling, Rosenbaum was the only person he could have seen portraying Lex on the series. He said that the thing that he sees inspiring Clark to become Superman would be the return of Lex and the interaction between the two characters; he explained that there is no Superman without Lex. At the 2010 Comic-Con, Welling said that Rosenbaum acknowledged the importance of Lex in the series and wanted to return in some degree for the final season, but that he needed to iron the details out. Welling said the season teased Lex's return with the introduction of bodies that Lex could tap into and heal himself later in life. Welling also stated that Lana could possibly have closure by season's end.

Schneider returned for the season premiere, and filmed three total episodes for his return to the series. He reprised his role in the episode "Kent", where Clark meets Jonathan in an alternate universe. The actor would make his third guest appearance in the series finale, along with O'Toole and John Glover (Lionel Luthor); Glover appeared for two episodes in late November 2010. Laura Vandervoort, who portrayed Clark's Kryptonian cousin Kara in season seven returned for the season's third episode, "Supergirl". According to Souders, Kara returns to Earth more as Supergirl and less as Kara. Souders emphasized that because Kara's return is in a heroic capacity, also revealing her ability to fly to the world, Kara works on developing an alter-ego through the use of eyeglasses and a wig. In addition, Kara provides her own input into Clark's development of his Superman persona. Vandervoort appeared in the season's 20th episode, titled "Prophecy".

James Marsters also returned for the series' 200th episode "Homecoming". Marsters first appeared as Brainiac / Milton Fine in season five and again in season seven. This time, Marsters portrayed Brainiac 5, the version of Brainiac from the future that the Legion of Super-Heroes created after removing the original version of Brainiac from Chloe's body in the season eight episode "Legion". In addition, both Michael Shanks and Jessica Parker Kennedy returned as Carter Hall / Hawkman and Plastique, respectively, in the second episode. Carter made a brief appearance in the season nine finale, while Plastique was last seen in season eight. The return of Carter meant a deeper look into who that character was, while seeing a "more human side" to him than previously seen. Michael Ironside and Peyton List returned for a mid-October episode as Lois' father General Sam Lane and Lois' sister Lucy, respectively. Both characters were last seen in separate season four episodes. Alan Ritchson reprised his role as Arthur Curry / Aquaman in a November episode. Ritchson described his character's return as "darker" and less "bubble-gummy" than previously seen on the series.

Cat Grant, a gossip columnist for the Daily Planet in the comic books, appeared as Clark's new partner during season ten, acting more as a "comedic foil" for Clark, and was not intended to interrupt the relationship he has with Lois. Instead, Cat acts as Lois's professional rival, and is considered by the producers to be her opposite. Keri Lynn Pratt, who portrays Cat, stated that her character has a crush on Clark, which annoys Lois more than threatens her. Pratt described her character's motivations: "Cat really believes in what she's working on and her message. She just really wants to get that through and have everyone on the same page as her. She kind of loses track of the big picture".

This season made the introductions of villains Granny Goodness, Desaad, and Glorious Godfrey. Lindsay Hartley was cast as another of Darkseid's minions, Mad Harriet, who works for Granny Goodness. Hartley explained the traditional claws her character wears are powered by kryptonite, which give her an advantage over Clark. She also said that Harriet is the leader of Granny Goodness' Female Furies.

In addition, Geoff Johns, who previously wrote the introductions for the Legion of Super-Heroes and the Justice Society of America, wrote the episode "Booster" that introduced superheroes Booster Gold and Blue Beetle. The version of Blue Beetle is Jaime Reyes, and Booster Gold is modeled directly after his comic book counterpart, including his personality and history. The second Blue Beetle, Ted Kord, was also introduced in that episode. Johns admitted that his choice of which comic book character to introduce was based solely on his personal preference, as he is a fan of Blue Beetle and Booster Gold and has a history of writing for those characters. These introductions came at a time when Clark needed to have interactions with the characters to "propel him forward". He noted that the two characters embody what Clark needs to learn: being in the public eye and fully accepting his alien heritage. Johns pointed out that Booster Gold is all about being in the spotlight, while Clark is not. At the same time, Blue Beetle is trying to understand the alien technology he has been given. Johns also stated that Booster's introduction serves to show Clark that society needs a hero to look up to. Eric Martsolf was cast as Booster, Sebastian Spence was cast as Kord, and Jaren Brandt Bartlett portrayed Jaime.

In addition to the return of Lois's father and sister, Teri Hatcher was cast as Lois's mother. Hatcher, who starred as Lois in Lois & Clark: The New Adventures of Superman (1993–1997), appeared in lost video footage that Lois discovers. Blue returned as Zod for the episode "Dominion". Rosenbaum returned to the series after he finally agreed to appear in the series finale and expressed that his return was for the fans. Chris Gauthier reprised his role as Toyman.

=== Superman mythology ===
With a glimpse of the iconic Superman costume in the season nine finale, Peterson confirmed at the time that the costume would return and play a more prominent role in the final season, even going as far as to hint that the last scene of Smallville would see Clark wearing it. The producers were able to acquire the Superman costume worn by Brandon Routh in the film Superman Returns (2006). DC Comics offered the suit worn by Christopher Reeve, but Peterson explained that it did not fit so much for the series. Welling promised to long-time viewers that their main goal was to finish the series in a way that would satisfy the fans and give them hope that Clark becomes Superman by the series' end. Souders said that in order for Clark to do this, Clark had to "wrestle" with the internal things that were preventing him from being an "inspirational hope". Though Clark is still in his "dark hour", he becomes Superman by the end of the season. Peterson explained that the palette of the show grows brighter when Clark puts on the costume; Clark ends up exploring his destiny and works toward his future of becoming a hero.

== Broadcast and reception ==
The season ten premiere brought in 2.98 million viewers, the highest viewing figures The CW had had in the Friday 8–9 pm timeslot in over two years. The series finale brought in 3.02 million viewers. By the end of its tenth season, Smallville became the longest running science fiction television show in the United States; it broke the Guinness World Record held by Stargate SG-1. TV Guide ranked the series finale 5th in its review of the Top TV Episodes of 2011.

== Home media release ==
The complete tenth season of Smallville was released on November 29, 2011, in North America in both DVD and Blu-ray format. The DVD and Blu-ray box set were also released in Region 2 and 4 on October 17, 2011, and April 4, 2012, respectively. The box set included various special features, including episode commentary, a documentary on the 200th episode called "Smallville: Coming Home", a featurette on Clark's father/son relationships over the course of ten seasons titled "My Father, My Son", and the music video "How Do We Do".
