= Sammy Herman =

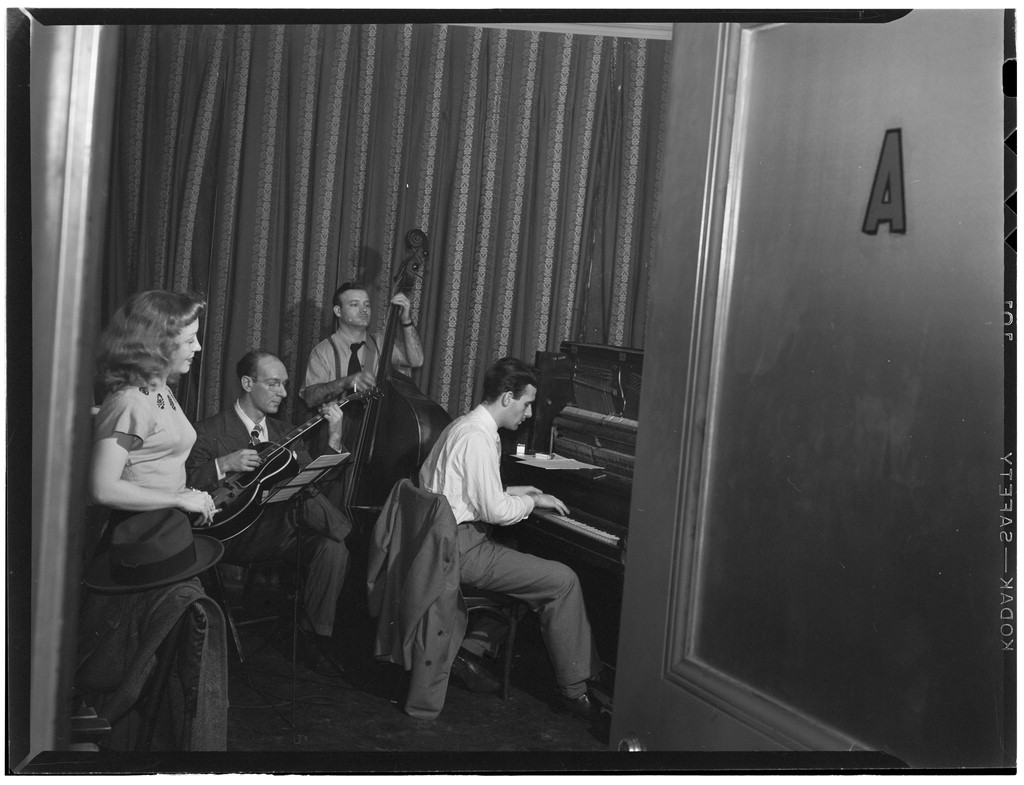
- Not Sammy Herman the xylophonist but Sammy Herman the jazz guitarist who was born in 1918.

Background information
- Born: Samuel Herbert Herman; May 7, 1903
- Died: May 23, 1995 (aged 92)
- Genres: jazz
- Instrument: xylophonist
- Label: Everest

Samuel Herbert Herman (7 May 1903, in Bronxwood Park, New York – 23 April 1995, in Fishkill, New York) was an American xylophonist at NBC radio and television.

According to Randall Eyles:

"Sammy Herman's radio debut was on WEAF in New York City in 1922. This was the beginning of a long career as a xylophone soloist on radio. He played on the "Lucky Strike Hit Parade" in the orchestras of Carl Hoff, Al Goodman, and Leo Reisman. In 1931 he played with Bing Crosby in Paul Whiteman's "Rhythm Boys" on the "Old Gold Hour". Perhaps most significant, Sammy performed every morning (with Frank Banta accompanying on piano) on N.B.C. radio."

Herman was inducted into the Percussive Arts Society Hall of Fame in 1994.

== Discography ==
- Something old, and something new! The Sammy Herman Sextet 1959
