= Something Borrowed (film) =

- Theatrical release poster
- Directed by: Luke Greenfield
- Screenplay by: Jennie Snyder Urman
- Based on: Something Borrowed by Emily Giffin
- Produced by: Hilary Swank; Molly Smith; Broderick Johnson; Andrew Kosove; Aaron Lubin; Pamela Schein Murphy
- Starring: Kate Hudson; Ginnifer Goodwin; John Krasinski; Colin Egglesfield; Steve Howey
- Cinematography: Charles Minsky
- Edited by: John Axelrad
- Music by: Alex Wurman
- Production companies: Alcon Entertainment; 2S Films
- Distributed by: Warner Bros. Pictures (North America and France); Summit Entertainment (International)
- Release dates: April 2011 (Newport Beach International Film Festival); May 6, 2011 (United States)
- Running time: 112 minutes
- Country: United States
- Language: English
- Budget: $35 million
- Box office: $60.1 million

Something Borrowed is a 2011 American romantic comedy film based on Emily Giffin's 2005 novel, directed by Luke Greenfield, starring Ginnifer Goodwin, Kate Hudson, Colin Egglesfield, and John Krasinski and distributed by Warner Bros. Pictures. Released on May 6, 2011, the film received negative reviews from critics and grossed $60 million.

== Plot ==
The free-spirited Darcy throws her friend Rachel a surprise 30th birthday party. Rachel is a single attorney in New York City, whereas Darcy is engaged to a man named Dex. Rachel's close friend Ethan is her confidant.

Darcy gets drunk at the party, so Dex takes her home but returns for her Chanel purse. Rachel offers to help look for it, and he gets her a drink for her birthday. Afterwards, a drunk Rachel mentions the crush she had on him in law school. Sharing a cab, she apologizes, he kisses her, and they wake up in bed together to Darcy's frantic message that Dex never came home.

Flashbacks show Rachel and Dex in law school, growing closer. One evening, over drinks, they are sharing personal stories, but Darcy showing up breaks the romantic mood. After being teased by Darcy about Dex, Rachel says he is just a friend. He is disappointed, but she does not notice. Darcy relentlessly flirts with Dex, so Rachel leaves.

Back in the present, things between Rachel and Dex remain awkward as the wedding plans proceed and Darcy hosts frequent gatherings in the Hamptons. Rachel says she is having sex with other men (first Marcus, then Ethan). Darcy tells her she cheated on Dex once with someone from work.

Ethan is frustrated at Rachel for never standing up for herself against Darcy. Friends with Rachel and sometimes foe to Darcy, he reluctantly agrees to tolerate Rachel's lies. However, he soon tires of the charade, trying to tell the group about Dex and Rachel, but she hits him with a racket, angering him for not confessing.

Meanwhile, Dex's mother is depressed, but her depression is being kept in check by her happiness with the upcoming wedding. Months after first being secretly intimate, Dex tries to talk to Rachel about what is between them; they skip Darcy's July 4 weekend in the Hamptons to stay in the city.

Running into his parents, Dex's father tells him to end it, as his wants are less important than the overall right. He stuck by Dex's mom with her troubles, so Dex should not abandon Darcy so close to the wedding.

As the wedding nears, Dex and Rachel speak less and less. At the beach, Ethan almost exposes their secret again. That night at the Hamptons bar, Rachel asks Dex to call off the wedding so they can be together, but he says he cannot.

Ethan moves to London for work, so Rachel goes to visit him a week before the wedding. He confesses he loves her, but accepts it is not mutual. Deciding to go to the New York wedding, she acknowledges she has to support Darcy. She finds Dex on her doorstep on her return to New York, as he called it off.

Rachel is ecstatic until Darcy arrives to talk. Dex hides, overhearing her confessing that she has been cheating with Marcus (while Dex was cheating with Rachel). She is now pregnant with Marcus' child, and says they are happy. On her way out, she sees Dex's jacket and searches the apartment for him. When Dex reveals himself, Darcy realizes that he cheated on her with Rachel. Dex and Darcy argue, and Darcy yells at Rachel through tears that she hates her and never wants to speak to her again, storming out.

Two months later, Rachel and Darcy run into each other. Darcy acts excited about her pregnancy, saying this is the happiest she has ever been. When Darcy notices Rachel has picked up one of Dex's shirts from the dry cleaner, she sees they are still together.

As they begin to walk away, Darcy turns and says that she truly is happy. Rachel smiles and says she is glad. Dex then calls, who is waiting on a bench around the corner for her. Joining him with a smile, he takes her hand as they walk together down the street.

In a mid-credits scene, Darcy surprises Ethan in London; he tries to ignore her, briskly sneaking away.

== Cast ==
- Ginnifer Goodwin as Rachel White
- Kate Hudson as Darcy Rhone
  - Peyton List as Young Darcy Rhone
- Colin Egglesfield as Dexter "Dex" Thaler III
- John Krasinski as Ethan
- Steve Howey as Marcus
- Ashley Williams as Claire
- Geoff Pierson as Dexter Thaler Sr.
- Jill Eikenberry as Bridget Thaler

== Reception ==
=== Critical response ===
Something Borrowed received negative reviews. Review aggregator Rotten Tomatoes reports that 15% of 117 critics have given the film a positive review, with an average rating of 4.00/10. The site's critical consensus reads: "In spite of solid performances from Kate Hudson and John Krasinski, Something Borrowed is an unpleasant misfire that lives down to its title." Metacritic assigned the film a weighted average score of 36 out of 100, based on 30 critics, indicating "generally unfavorable reviews". Audiences polled by CinemaScore gave the film an average grade of "B" on an A+ to F scale.

=== Box office ===
Something Borrowed grossed $39 million in the United States and Canada and $21.1 million in other territories for a worldwide total of $60.1 million, against a budget of $35 million.

It made $13.9 million in its opening weekend, finishing in fourth place. It then made $6.9 million and $3.5 million in the next two subsequent weekends.

== Possible sequel ==
In 2014, Emily Giffin confirmed that she had written the script for a sequel, Something Blue, based on her own 2005 novel of the same name. In February 2016, Giffin continued to suggest that she was working on the film sequel, though no other parties had issued any statements supporting this.

As of November 2017 there was still no official news from any production companies, despite a May 2017 Facebook post from Giffin.

== Home media ==
The film was released on DVD and Blu-Ray on August 16, 2011.
