= Emily Giffin =

American writer

- Born: Emily Fisk Giffin; March 20, 1972 (age 54); Baltimore, Maryland, U.S.
- Education: Wake Forest University (BA); University of Virginia School of Law (JD)
- Occupation: Writer
- Website: emilygiffin.com

Emily Fisk Giffin (born March 20, 1972) is an American author of several novels, including Something Borrowed, Heart of the Matter, Where We Belong, and The One and Only.

== Early life ==
Emily Giffin was born on March 20, 1972. She attended Naperville North High School in Naperville, Illinois, where she was a member of the creative writing club and served as editor-in-chief of the school's newspaper. Afterwards, Giffin earned her undergraduate degree at Wake Forest University, where she double-majored in history and English and served as basketball and football team managers. She then attended law school at the University of Virginia.

== Career ==
After graduating from the University of Virginia School of Law in 1997, Giffin moved to Manhattan, where she worked in the litigation department of Winston & Strawn. In 2001, she moved to London and began writing full-time. Her first young adult novel, Lily Holding True, was rejected by eight publishers. Giffin started writing a new novel, originally titled Rolling the Dice, which became her 2004 book Something Borrowed. The novel made The New York Times Best Seller list.

In 2002, Giffin found an agent and signed a two-book contract with St. Martin's Press. St. Martin's Griffin published Giffin's first six novels. Her subsequent novels are published by Penguin Random House.

Nine of Giffin's novels have become New York Times bestsellers. Three books appeared simultaneously on USA Today's top 150 list. Something Borrowed was adapted into a feature film (released on May 6, 2011), and its sequel novel, Something Blue, has been optioned for film.

Her novel The Summer Pact was released in July 2024. Love You More came out in July 2026.

Vanity Fair described Giffin as a "modern day Jane Austen" while The New York Times dubbed her a "dependably down-to-earth storyteller".

== Novels ==
- Something Borrowed (2004)
- Something Blue (2005)
- Baby Proof (2006)
- Love the One You're With (2008)
- Heart of the Matter (2010)
- The Diary of Darcy J. Rhone (2012)
- Where We Belong (2012)
- The One and Only (2014)
- First Comes Love (2016)
- All We Ever Wanted (2018)
- The Lies That Bind (2020)
- Meant to Be (2022)
- The Summer Pact (2024)
- Love You More (2026)
