= Something Borrowed (novel) =

Book by Emily Giffin

- Cover of most recent edition
- Author: Emily Giffin
- Language: English
- Genre: Chick lit, Romance, Comedy
- Publisher: St. Martin's Press
- Publication date: March 10, 2005
- Publication place: United States
- Media type: Print (hardcover and paperback), Audiobook, Ebook
- Pages: 352
- ISBN: 0-312-32119-8
- OCLC: 58802337

Something Borrowed is a 2005 novel by author Emily Giffin. The novel concerns morals regarding friends and relationships. It addresses the stigma against single women in their thirties and the pressure that society places on them to get married. "This is a realistic situation that women face in today's society", according to one book review.

The title comes from a "Something old, something new", a traditional nursery rhyme concerning a bride's attire.

Something Borrowed became an international bestseller and was placed on The New York Times Best Seller list, among others. It was developed into a film by Hilary Swank's shared production company.

== Plot summary ==
The novel centers around the protagonist and narrator, Rachel White, a thirty-year-old single woman who is a consummate good-girl. She and Darcy Rhone have been best friends since childhood, and hard-working Rachel is often in the shadow of flashy, sometimes selfish Darcy. Then, after a night of drinking on Rachel's thirtieth birthday, she sleeps with Darcy's fiancé, Dex. After this turns into an affair, Rachel explores the meaning of friendship, true love, and ethics.

== Awards and honors ==
The novel, along with two others by Giffin, was an international bestseller, being on both The New York Times Best Seller list and USA Today's Top 150 list.

== Film ==
Hilary Swank and Molly Smith acquired the rights to co-produce a film based on the novel Something Borrowed. Warner Bros. (USA/Canada), Entertainment Film Distributors (UK), Summit Entertainment, (International) Alcon Entertainment developed the project along with 2S Films and Wild Ocean Films.

The film was directed by Luke Greenfield. Actress Ginnifer Goodwin played the lead role of Rachel. Kate Hudson was cast as Darcy, Rachel's best friend. John Krasinski played Ethan, Rachel's friend and confidant in both Something Borrowed and Something Blue. Colin Egglesfield played Darcy's fiancé, Dex, while Steve Howey played Marcus. Warner Bros. released the film adaptation on May 6, 2011, and received a 3.9/10 on Rotten Tomatoes.
