= Terry Brooks bibliography =

This is the complete list of works by American fantasy author Terry Brooks.

== Bibliography ==
=== Shannara series ===
==== Original Shannara Trilogy ====
1. The Sword of Shannara (1977)
2. The Elfstones of Shannara (1982)
3. The Wishsong of Shannara (1985)

==== Heritage of Shannara ====
1. The Scions of Shannara (1990)
2. The Druid of Shannara (1991)
3. The Elf Queen of Shannara (1992)
4. The Talismans of Shannara (1993)

==== Prequel to the Original Shannara Trilogy ====
1. First King of Shannara (1996)

==== Word & Void ====
1. Running with the Demon (1997)
2. A Knight of the Word (1998)
3. Angel Fire East (1999)

==== The Voyage of the Jerle Shannara ====
1. Ilse Witch (2000)
2. Antrax (2001)
3. Morgawr (2002)

==== High Druid of Shannara ====
1. Jarka Ruus (2003)
2. Tanequil (2004)
3. Straken (2005)

==== The Genesis of Shannara ====
1. Armageddon's Children (August, 2006)
2. The Elves of Cintra (August 2007)
3. The Gypsy Morph (August 2008)

==== Legends of Shannara ====
1. Bearers of the Black Staff (August 2010)
2. The Measure of the Magic (August 2011)

==== Paladins of Shannara ====
1. Allanon's Quest (July 2012) (eBook short story, prequel to The Sword of Shannara)
2. The Weapon Master's Choice (January 2013) (eBook short story)
3. The Black Irix (June 2013) (eBook short story)

==== The Dark Legacy of Shannara ====
1. Wards of Faerie (August 2012)
2. Bloodfire Quest (March 2013)
3. Witch Wraith (July 2013)

==== The Defenders of Shannara ====
1. The High Druid's Blade (July 2014)
2. The Darkling Child (June 2015)
3. The Sorcerer's Daughter (May 2016)

==== The Fall of Shannara ====
1. The Black Elfstone (June 2017)
2. The Skaar Invasion (May 2018)
3. The Stiehl Assassin (June 2019)
4. The Last Druid (October 2020)

==== The First Druids of Shannara ====
1. Galaphile (March 11, 2025)
2. Brona (with Delilah Dawson, 2026)

==== Shannara related works ====
- Imaginary Friends (1991 & Spring 2013) (Word/Void (early draft) short story published in anthology Once Upon a Time: A Treasury of Modern Fairy Tales, re-published in Unfettered: New Tales by Masters of Fantasy)
- Shannara computer game (1995) by Lori Ann Cole and Corey Cole
- The World of Shannara (2001) (companion book) with Teresa Patterson (Revised edition Fall 2009)
- Indomitable (2003) (short story published in anthology Legends II)
- Dark Wraith of Shannara (2008) (graphic novel)
- Walker and the Shade of Allanon (Spring 2013) (short story published in Unfettered: New Tales by Masters of Fantasy)
- Small Magic: Short Fiction, 1977-2020 (2021)

=== Magic Kingdom of Landover ===
Note: This is not part of the Shannara series.

1. Magic Kingdom for Sale — SOLD! (1986)
2. The Black Unicorn (1987)
3. Wizard at Large (1988)
4. The Tangle Box (1994)
5. Witches' Brew (1995)
6. A Princess of Landover (2009)

=== Viridian Deep ===
Note: This is not part of the Shannara series.

1. Child of Light (2021)
2. Daughter of Darkness (2022)
3. Sister of Starlit Seas (2023)

=== Other ===
- Why I Write About Elves (2005) (essay published as an Amazon short)
- The Writers Complete Fantasy Reference: An Indispensable Compendium of Myth and Magic (Writer's Digest Books, 2000), with Michael J. Varhola
- Sometimes the Magic Works: Lessons from a Writing Life (2003)
- Hook — novelization of the film (Ballantine Books, 17 December 1991) ISBN 0-449-90707-4.
- Star Wars Episode I: The Phantom Menace — novelization of the film (1999)
- Street Freaks (2018)
