= The Talismans of Shannara =

1993 novel by Terry Brooks

- Cover art of The Talismans of Shannara
- Author: Terry Brooks
- Cover artist: Keith Parkinson
- Language: English
- Series: Heritage of Shannara
- Genre: Fantasy
- Publisher: Del Rey Books
- Publication date: March 1993
- Publication place: United States
- Media type: Print (hardback & paperback)
- Pages: 453 (hardcover); 464 (paperback)
- ISBN: 0-345-36300-0 (hardcover); ISBN 0-345-38674-4 (paperback)
- OCLC: 27068604
- Dewey Decimal: 813/.54 20
- LC Class: PS3552.R6596 T3 1993
- Preceded by: The Elf Queen of Shannara
- Followed by: Ilse Witch

The Talismans of Shannara is a fantasy novel by American writer Terry Brooks, the fourth in his tetralogy The Heritage of Shannara.

== Plot summary ==
The Elves and Paranor are both now back in the Four Lands, and the former Walker Boh has inherited Allanon's powers. Moreover, the Sword of Shannara has been found. Knowing all these, Rimmer Dall decides to attempt to destroy all of The Scions of Shannara. Rimmer Dall dispatches the Four Horsemen (Famine, Pestilence, War and Death) to Paranor, sends Wren an untrue friend and wants to deceive Par Ohmsford, whose wishsong is growing steadily more uncontrollable.

All the traps laid by Rimmer Dall come to fruition even before the Ohmsfords realize that all of the charges laid by the shade of Allanon have been fulfilled. The Scions struggle to control their powers: Walker Boh has problems using the knowledge and power he received, Wren Ohmsford has to gain the confidence of the Elven minister as well as the head of the Elven army, and Par Ohmsford struggles to use the Sword of Shannara.

In a clash with a Shadowen, which happens to be Coll in disguise, Par Ohmsford finds out that the Sword really works and is truly the lost Sword of Shannara. During the fight, through the truth that is revealed by the Sword, Par discovers who he had really fought, and then follows Coll to help him. Together they go to Rainbow Lake and finally, with the help of the King of Silver River, Par saves his brother from Rimmer Dall, the leader of the Shadowen. However, due to back-firing of his own wishsong magic, he is left behind. Rimmer Dall imprisons Par Ohmsford at Southwatch and starts trying to break into his mind.

At Paranor, Walker Boh fights the Four Horsemen, defeating all of them but losing his old friend Cogline in the fight with Death. Later, Walker dreams of Allanon, who asks him to help the Ohmsfords before they are lost. At Arborlon, Wren Ohmsford sets out to war against a Federation army. With the help of Triss and Tiger Ty, she manages to lead the Elves to a first victory, but then Creepers, who are responsible for the fall of the Dwarves, come to the aid of the Federation army.

Damson Rhee, with help from Matty Roh and Morgan Leah, rescue Padishar Creel, who goes north to summon the army of the Free-born to aid the Elves in their war against the Federation. Damson Rhee, Matty Roh and Morgan Leah then travel further south in search of Par Ohmsford. At the same time Coll realizes what has happened to him and starts traveling north to Southwatch to rescue Par Ohmsford. However, he is captured by a group of slave traders.

Wren Ohmsford is deceived by Shadowen and captured to be taken to Southwatch. Morgan Leah manages to attack the wagon in which she was being carried and rescues her. On her way back to the elves she is rescued from the Shadowen by Tiger Ty and his Roc who tracked her. Tiger Ty informs Wren Ohmsford that he met Padishar Creel and the free born army were on their way to help the elves. Wren Ohmsford with Tiger Ty and Triss by her side fly south to destroy the Creepers. At Southwatch Walker Boh and Rumor, the moor cat, appears and helps Morgan Leah just as he is about to be attacked by a Shadowen patrol. Coll Ohmsford is rescued by Damson Rhee and Matty Roh from the slave traders. Coll Ohmsford, Damson Rhee and Matty Roh travel towards Southwatch to meet with Morgan Leah and rescue Par Ohmsford.

At Matted Brakes, Wren Ohmsford successfully destroys Creepers with the help of Triss, Tiger Ty, Stresa and Faun. As the Elven army battles the Federation, Shadowen attack Wren Ohmsford from the deep forest and are about to kill her when Faun, the tree squeak, gives up her fears and attacks the Shadowen just to give Wren enough time to call the magic of the elf stones and burn them up. Wren discovers Faun's dead body lying among her Home Guards. On the same day Desidio is also lost. Just then, when the Elven army is almost about to lose, the Freeborn army appear out of eastland with men and Rock Trolls. Elves headed by Triss and Barsimmon Oridio, Men headed by Padishar Creel and Chandos and Trolls headed by Axhind join forces under Wren Ohmsford to attempt to crush down the Southlander army.

Walker Boh, Coll Ohmsford, Damson Rhee, Matty Roh, Morgan Leah, and Rumor (the moor cat) journey into Southwatch, the Shadowen stronghold, from where they have been draining the Earth's magic. They rescue Par Ohmsford by help of the Sword of Shannara. Par learns that, being half elven and half Shannara, he is partially Shadowen. He finally frees "The stolen Earth Magic" which was bound by Shadowen, bringing down Rimmer Dall and other Shadowen and dark creatures of its type. Walker Boh, Par Ohmsford, Coll Ohmsford, Damson Rhee, Matty Roh, and Morgan Leah escape just before Southwatch crumbles to the ground. With the release of the Earth Magic, the lands' beauty is restored and the sickness that was destroying the land is cured. The Earth Magic kills all the Shadowen and Creepers in the Federation army which leads to victory of the elves and their allies.

== Reception ==
The Talismans of Shannara has received negative reviews. A review in Kirkus said it was a "flabby and predictable work, not helped by the whole increasingly threadbare Shannara concept, now clearly past its sell-by date", while commenting that "fans of the series won't be dissuaded".
