= Dark Wraith of Shannara =

Graphic novel by Terry Brooks

- Cover art for the novel.
- Author: story adapted by Robert Place Napton; produced by Terry Brooks
- Illustrator: Edwin David
- Cover artist: Edwin David
- Language: English
- Genre: Fantasy/Epic fantasy
- Publisher: Del Rey Books
- Publication date: 2008
- Publication place: United States
- Media type: Mass market paperback
- Pages: 208 pp (Mass market paperback)
- ISBN: 978-0-345-49462-7
- OCLC: 190761241
- Dewey Decimal: 741.5/973 22
- LC Class: PN6727.B7565 D37 2008
- Preceded by: Indomitable
- Followed by: The Scions of Shannara

The Dark Wraith of Shannara is a graphic novel produced by Terry Brooks in his Shannara series. The story is set several years after the events of The Wishsong of Shannara and Indomitable.

== Background ==
The novel was released on March 25, 2008. It is approximately 208 pages, but much of the book is "behind the scenes" material, such as the creation of the story and preliminary sketches. The story was produced by Terry Brooks, adapted by Robert Place Napton, and illustrated by Edwin David. The novel was Del Rey's first original graphic novel project.

== Plot summary ==
=== Beginning ===
Dark Wraith of Shannara began with Jair Ohmsford having a recurring dream in which he relives a section of Indomitable where he managed to become the slain "Weapons Master" Garet Jax. He talked to his sister, Brin, about how he used the Wishsong to do something real (as all he had been able to do before was illusion). She asked Jair to promise not to use the Wishsong again as she feared that he would lose himself in the magic, and not be able to return to who he is if he became Garet Jax again. Jair promised to refrain from using the Wishsong again.

=== Meeting with Allanon ===
Jair left, but that night, he was visited by the shade of Allanon, who told him that Kimber Boh and Cogline were captured by Mwellrets and their master, the Croton Witch. Allanon tells him that they seek to gain information about how to return Paranor to the world from Cogline, who had previously been a Druid. Upon restoring Paranor, they aimed to learn the secrets of the power of the Druids. Jair reluctantly decided that he had to rescue Kimber and Cogline.

=== The Journey ===
After meeting Slanter, they both left for Darklin Reach. Upon arriving, Jair and Slanter discovered the tracks made by the Mwellrets and their prisoners. They were also found by Whisper, who tracked Kimber to the cave in which she was trapped. They found her with a broken leg and unable to travel, so they took her back to Hearthstone, where she and Cogline had lived, to recover. Jair learns from Kimber that the Croton Witch tortured Cogline until he told her how to restore Paranor, and she has forced him to accompany her to Paranor to work the magic.

Soon after they left, Slanter and Jair were confronted by a Koden. Slanter was thrown against a rock and knocked half-blind and dazed, so Jair is forced to break his promise to Brin. He used the Wishsong to become Garet Jax once more, and he quickly slayed the Koden. Eventually, Jair and Slanter found the Mwellrets and the Croton Witch, who are forcing Cogline to use magic to bring back Paranor. Although Jair and Slanter attempted to stop them, it was too late: Paranor was restored. Jair was once more forced to become Garet Jax. Jair, as Garet, destroyed the Mwellrets, and attempted to engage the Croton Witch in combat to the death—but the protective mist of Paranor that slays any who come into contact with it quickly destroyed the Croton Witch. (The mist was the final defense of Paranor; if the castle fell, then it would kill every living thing inside of it.) The mist attempted to destroy Jair and Slanter as well, and so they were forced to take Cogline and run. Jair, with the speed and power of Garet Jax, was able to lead them to safety, and managed to transform back to Jair Ohmsford.

=== Aftermath ===
After Kimber and Cogline's reunion, Kimber asked Jair to stay with her. He decided to forego the request and leave with Slanter, saying that he had to find out about himself first.
