= Allanon's Quest =

2012 short story by Terry Brooks

Allanon’s Quest
- First edition
- Author: Terry Brooks
- Cover artist: Stephen Youll
- Language: English
- Series: Paladins of Shannara
- Genre: Fantasy
- Publisher: Del Rey Books
- Publication date: July 9, 2012
- Publication place: United States
- Media type: eBook
- Pages: 39 pp
- Preceded by: First King of Shannara
- Followed by: The Sword of Shannara

"Allanon's Quest" is a fantasy short story by Terry Brooks in his Shannara series. It is the first in a trilogy of short stories that make up the Paladins of Shannara series, first published in 2012.

== Plot summary ==
Allanon is on a desperate quest to find the last heir of Shannara before the Skull Bearers can wipe them all out. His quest takes him to the small village of Archer Trace, where he interrogates an innkeeper about the whereabouts of Eldra Derrivanian. Eldra is an elf who worked for the Elessedil Royal family as a historian that specialized in genealogy. After his son was killed under mysterious circumstances while serving in the Home Guard, Eldra felt the king did not do enough to discover who the killer was and bring him to justice. He then began neglecting and sabotaging his work, and eventually was dismissed. In disgrace, he left Arborlon with his wife and went into hiding near Archer Trace. After tracking him down, Allanon questions him as to whom the last heir of Shannara is and Eldra tells him that it is a man named Weir.

Allanon travels to Weir's home, and wonders about Eldra's strange behavior. He seemed tense and afraid. When he arrives at Weir's home he is attacked and takes a dagger to the chest, but using Druid magic he is able to kill most of his attackers, while the rest flee. During the assault, Allanon uses one of his attackers as a human shield. The man is pierced and killed by arrows. Afterwards, a Skull Bearer reveals himself long enough to tell Allanon that the man he used as a human shield was Weir, last heir of Shannara.

Allanon retreats to the home of friends where he is healed of his wounds by medicine and magic, then returns to the home of Eldra. Eldra seems relieved to see him, and Allanon immediately knows he didn't expect him to survive. Eldra confesses that he had been ordered by the Skull Bearer to set Allanon up. The Skull Bearer had been in his bedroom during Allanon's visit, and had threatened to murder his wife if he didn't tell Allanon exactly what he was told. The Warlock Lord not only wanted Shannara's last heir dead, but he wanted him dead by Allanon's hand as revenge for Bremen casting him out of the Druid Keep. He wanted Allanon to know that he was responsible for the death of the Four Lands' last hope. Eldra reveals, however, that Weir was an evil man that allied himself to the Warlock Lord, and would have been no help anyway. He also reveals that Weir was not the last heir of Shannara. Aren Shea is. He has just reached manhood, and now goes by Shea Ohmsford. Shea's parents were murdered mysteriously, so Eldra and his wife hid the boy and later left him in the care of the Ohmsfords. Eldra then takes his own life to protect this secret from the Skull Bearers and to protect his wife, knowing that the Skull Bearers won't bother with her if he is dead. Allanon sets off to find Shea.

== Characters ==
The characters:

- Allanon is a Druid who has been alive for around 400 years through the use of Druid Sleep.
- Eldra Derrivanian is an Elven historian of genealogy.
