= Shannara =

Series of books by Terry Brooks

Shannara /ˈʃænərə/ is a series of high fantasy novels written by Terry Brooks, beginning with The Sword of Shannara in 1977 and concluding with The Last Druid which was released in October 2020; there is also a prequel, First King of Shannara. The series blends magic and primitive technology and is set in the Four Lands, which are identified as Earth long after civilization was destroyed in a chemical and nuclear holocaust called the Great Wars. By the time of the prequel First King of Shannara, the world had reverted to a pre-industrial state and magic had re-emerged to supplement science.

In March 2025, Brooks announced his semi-retirement and that Delilah S. Dawson would be taking on the authorship of his Shannara legendarium going forward.

== Setting ==
The Shannara series is set in a post-apocalyptic world called the Four Lands. This world is a futuristic version of our own, and not a secondary world. The Genesis of Shannara trilogy reveals the Four Lands to be located in the modern Pacific Northwest region of the United States and Canada. Much of the landscape has been changed by a future nuclear holocaust called The Great Wars, but some landmarks remain. For example, the Columbia River still exists.

Each land is named after the compass point it faces: the Northland, the Southland, the Eastland, and the Westland, and is the primary home of different peoples. The Westland is the homeland primarily of the elves, while the Northland is mostly inhabited by trolls and the Eastland is the home mostly of dwarves and gnomes. The Southland is primarily the homeland of humans.

Maps of the Four Lands

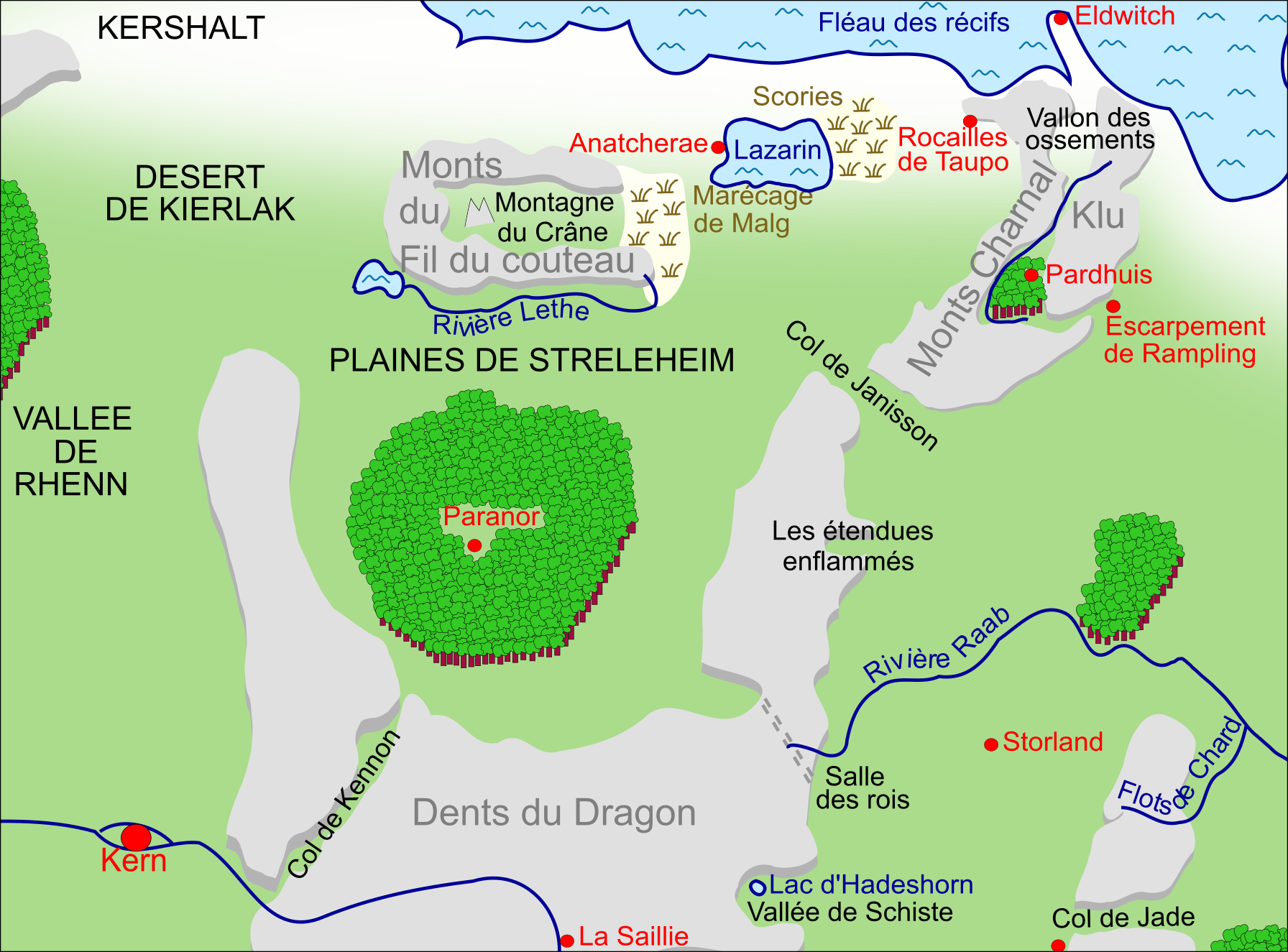
Northland

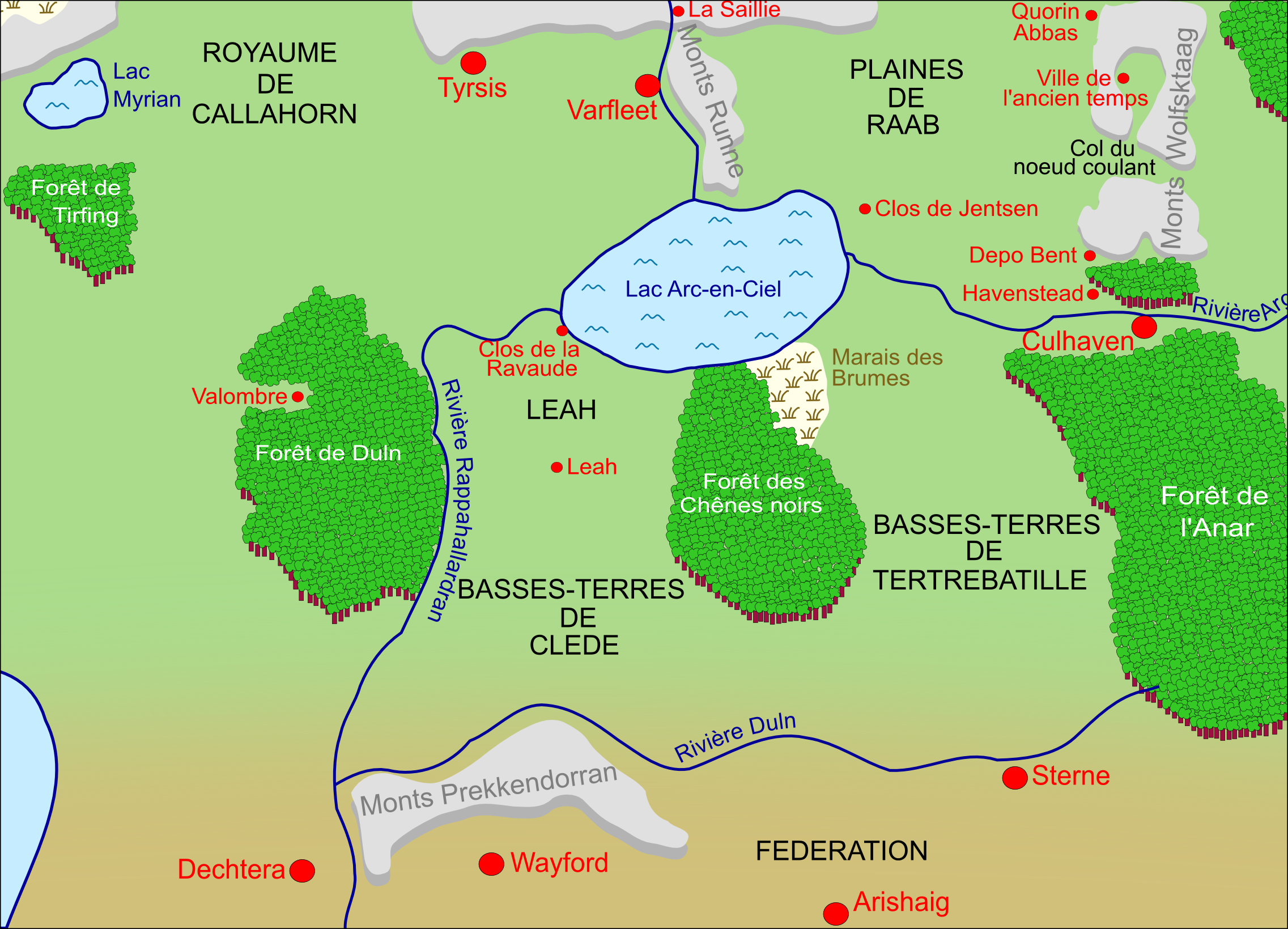
Southland

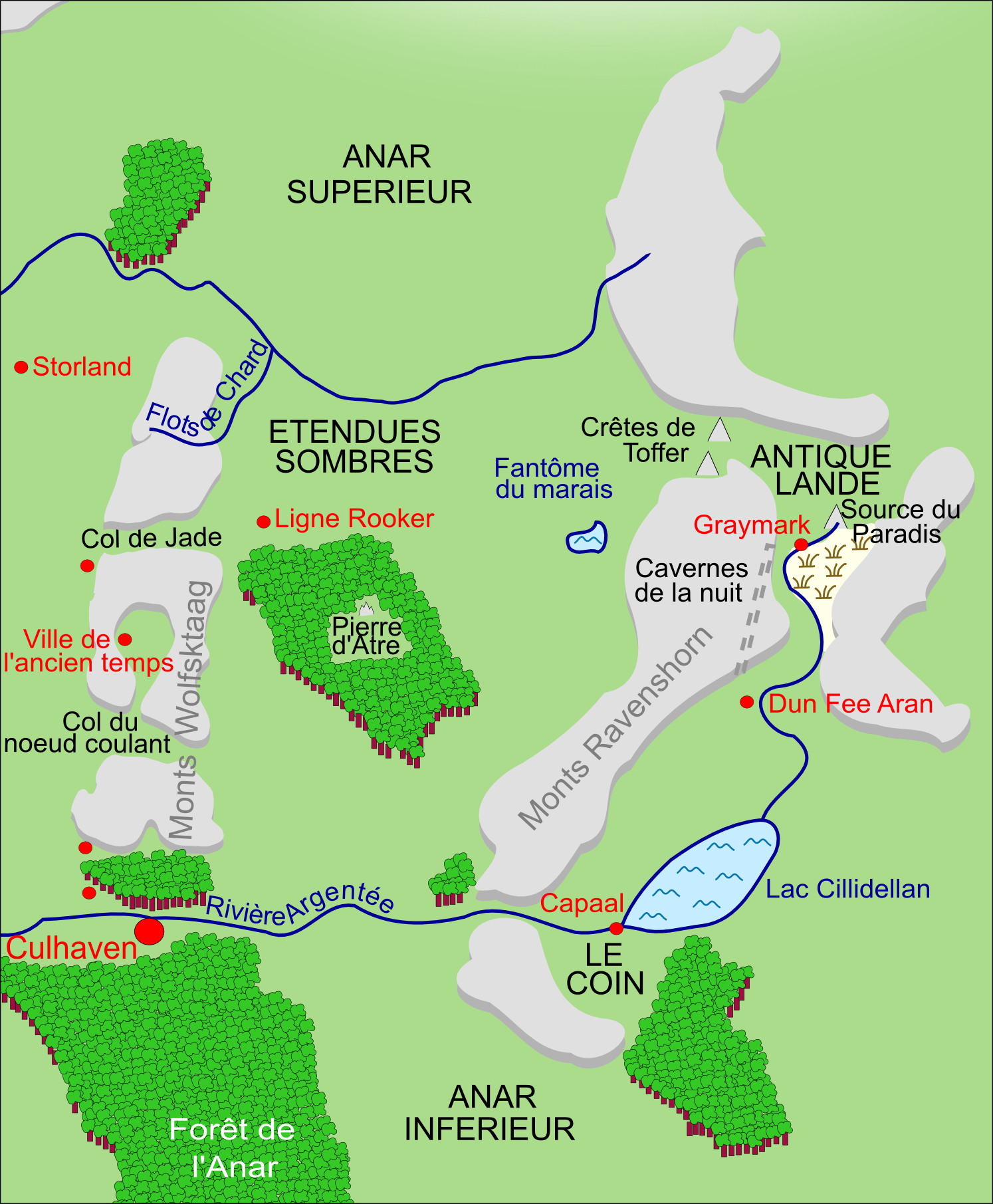
Eastland

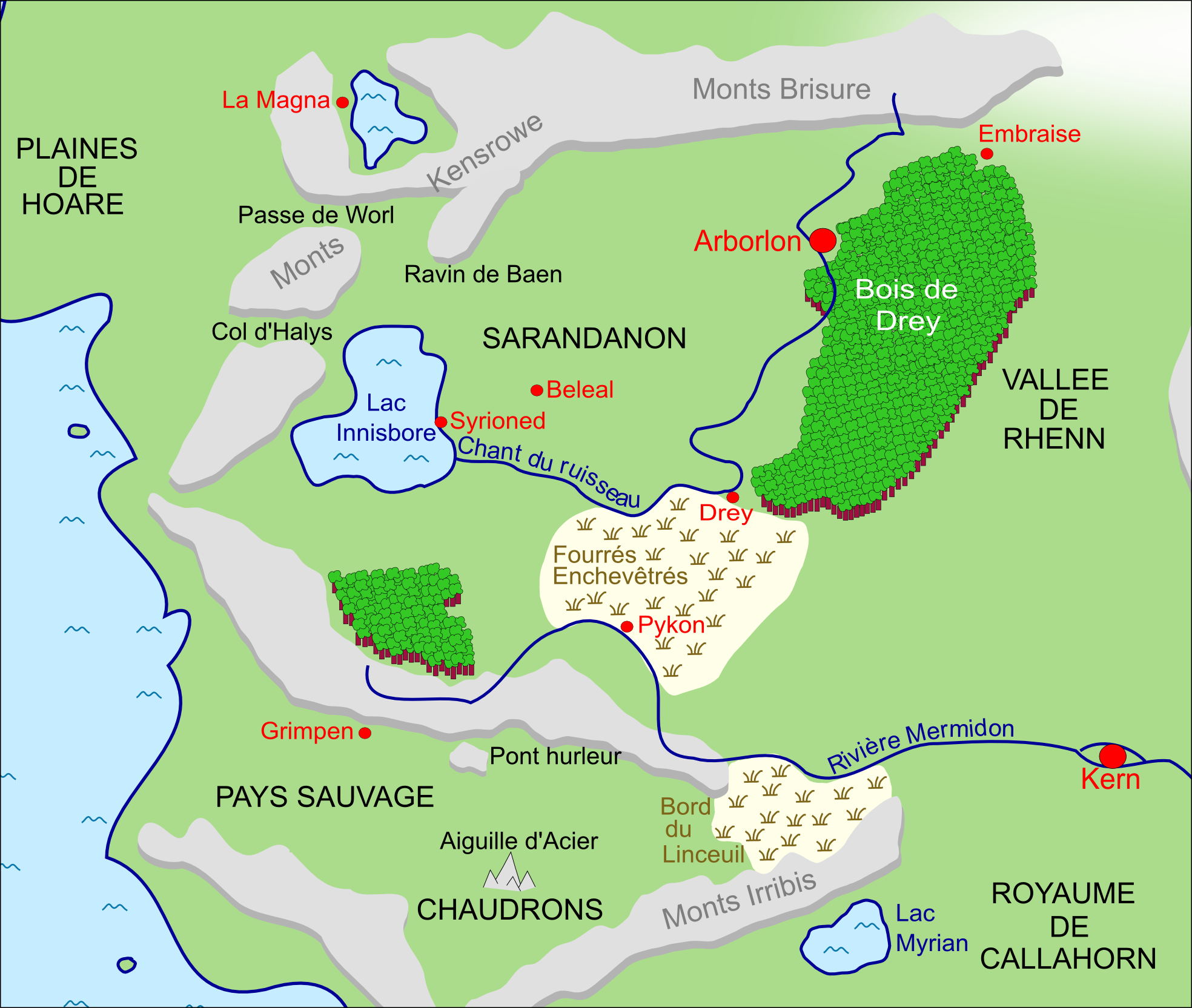
Westland

== Characters ==
- Allanon, described as Brooks' "most enigmatic character", is very secretive and the last remaining Druid of the original order. Trained by Bremen, he lived an unexpectedly long life, being the Druid that summons the Ohmsford family during the original trilogy (Sword, Elfstones, and Wishsong). He is never completely honest, telling many white lies or half-truths, and provides others with information only if it is dangerous, crucial, or required. Allanon often called on the aid of the Ohmsford family in the novels, as they are descendants of Jerle Shannara and therefore the only ones who can use the Sword of Shannara. He called upon Shea Ohmsford in The Sword of Shannara, Wil Ohmsford in The Elfstones of Shannara and Brin and Jair Ohmsford in The Wishsong of Shannara.
- Galaphile was the Elf who was responsible in the creation of the Druids. Meeting at Paranor, it was he that believed that the Druids shouldn't belong to any one race, so they became separated from the people.
- The Druids are an order of historians, philosophers, magic-users, teachers and researchers. The greatest minds that remained in the Four Lands were first assembled by Galaphile at the fortress of Paranor. Druid Magic, like most of the magic that originates in the Four Lands, is elemental. It draws from the earth, air, fire and water in various forms. Its power is enhanced or weakened by the strength of the user. Some users would find more success with talismans like the Sword or the Elfstones than others. Sometimes the magic of a talisman or an external source links with the magic innate in a user, causing various results. Unlike science, magic is uncertain, and the results of its application are not always predictable.
- The Warlock Lord was formerly a Druid named Brona, who was removed from the walls of Paranor for studying and practicing forbidden magic found in an ancient sentient tome called the Ildatch. He and his followers then inhabited the Skull Kingdom deep in the Northland.
- King of the Silver River is a Faerie creature who appears throughout the series.
- Skull Bearers were Druids once upon a time, but they were subverted by the Ildatch along with the druid Brona, who would later become the Warlock Lord. They "sacrificed their humanity" to become "winged black destroyers"; but in doing this, they tied themselves to their master, the Warlock Lord, and became his "dread minion[s]". Reviewers and critics had mixed opinions on the Skull Bearers. Praise for them came from Frank Herbert, the author of Dune, who liked all of the "monsters" in The Sword of Shannara. He said that "[Terry] Brooks creates distillations of horror that hark back to childhood's shadows, when the most important thing about a fearful creature was that you didn't know its exact shape and intent. You only knew that it wanted you. The black-winged skull bearer, for instance, is more than a euphemism for death." Tom Shippey wasn't so positive, as he thought that the Skull Bearers were very familiar to those who had read The Lord of the Rings: he found that the Skull Bearers were "analogues" for the Nazgûl.
- Demons is a common name for many different creatures in novels by Terry Brooks. They are creatures that were trapped inside the Forbidding after the creation of the Ellcrys.
- The Dagda Mor is the antagonist of The Elfstones of Shannara. He is the most powerful Demon locked inside the Forbidding. As such, most of the others obey him out of fear, with a few notable exceptions, such as the Reaper. He channels his magic through his Staff of Power.
- Shea Ohmsford is the protagonist of The Sword of Shannara. He has the blood of Jerle Shannara, making him the only one who can wield the powerful Sword of Shannara to vanquish the Warlock Lord. A major theme of The Sword of Shannara revolves around Shea. Part of his quest, in addition to killing the Warlock Lord, includes finding a belief in himself, so that he will have confidence to go on. This is a search that every subsequent Brooks protagonist must undergo. Scholar Tom Shippey believed that Shea was too familiar to those who had read The Lord of the Rings: he found that Shea and Flick were "analogues" for the hobbits of Tolkien's stories. Terry Brooks stated in his autobiography that "[his] protagonists [Shea and Flick] are cut from the same bolt of cloth as Bilbo and Frodo Baggins."
- Garet Jax is known as the "Weapons Master" Garet first appears when he rescues Jair Ohmsford from a band of nine Gnome Hunters, defeating eight of them single-handedly—he killed six, knocked out their leader, and one fled. The ninth, Slanter, doesn't even attempt to fight, saying that he was only working with them because he had to, and he has heard stories about the fighting prowess of Garet. Terry Brooks expressed his desire in the beginning of Dark Wraith to further explore the relationship between Jair and Garet Jax.
- Cogline is the "grandfather" of Kimber Boh. Cogline found Kimber after Gnomes killed Kimber's parents when she was an infant. It is later found out that Cogline was a former failed Druid, with knowledge of alchemical arts. Was referred to as Walker Boh's guardian and teacher before Walker Boh became a Druid. Cogline aids Brin in her leg of the journey to find and destroy the Ildatch, the ancient Book of Power that holds the forbidden knowledge of the Druids. It is referred to as the book that led the Druid Brona to becoming the Warlock Lord.
- Wil Ohmsford is the grandson of Shea Ohmsford. One who would forsake his birthright he sought to become a healer, studying amongst the Stors at Storlock. He unwillingly became the protector of the Chosen Amberle, after being sought out by Allanon, on the quest to restore the Ellcrys and reseal the crumbling wall of the Forbidding.
- Eventine Elessedil is possibly the greatest Elven King, with perhaps the exception of Jerle Shannara. He is the backbone that the Elves need to withstand the attacks of the Warlock Lord in The Sword of Shannara and the Demon hordes in The Elfstones of Shannara.

== Important places ==
- Arborlon is the capital city of the Elves. It is unusual, in that it is not bound to a particular location, but basically moves with the Elves by being transferred into a magic Gemstone, called the Loden. In the "Genesis of Shannara" trilogy, it is located in the Cintra. In most novels, it is located in the Westland except for the "Heritage of Shannara" tetralogy where it is located on the island Morrowindl before being brought back by Wren Ohmsford.
- Paranor is the fortress home of the druids. Technically located in the Northland, it remains close to each of the Four Lands so that the Druids would not show favoritism towards one people.
- Shady Vale is the ancestral Southland home of the Ohmsfords.
- Tyrsis is one of the largest human cities. It is in the borderlands known as Callahorn, between the Northland and the Southland and serves as the first line of defense against the Northland armies.
- Storlock is home to the healers known as the Stors. Located in the Eastland, it is much like Paranor as it does not show favoritism towards one people.
- Leah is a small highland kingdom located southwest of Rainbow Lake. The ruling family, the Leah's, join in on many of the Ohmsford adventures.

== Novels ==
=== Word & Void ===
The Word & Void series (also called The Word and The Void) focuses on John Ross and Nest Freemark, forced acquaintances who use magic given to them from the Word to prevent mankind from being overcome by the demonic forces of the Void. The trilogy consists of Running with the Demon, A Knight of the Word, and Angel Fire East and is predominantly set in 1990's and early 2000's Illinois. It follows Nest Freemark, a girl with magical abilities who has no known relationship to any Shannara character. Before the publication of Armageddon's Children it was unclear whether this trilogy existed within the Shannara universe. It has since been revealed as the "ultimate prequel" to the Shannara novels.

=== The Genesis of Shannara ===
The Genesis of Shannara series consists of Armageddon's Children, The Elves of Cintra and The Gypsy Morph. They cover events during The Great Wars, which are alluded to often in the Shannara series.

=== Legends of Shannara ===
The Legends of Shannara series consists of Bearers of the Black Staff and The Measure of the Magic.

=== The First Druids of Shannara ===
The First Druids of Shannara series consists of Galaphile and Brona.. They cover the origin of druids in Shannara.

=== First King of Shannara ===
This is the prequel to the Original Shannara Trilogy.

=== The Sword of Shannara ===
Also published as the Original Shannara Trilogy by Del Rey Books, these were the first three published Shannara novels (The Sword of Shannara, The Elfstones of Shannara, and The Wishsong of Shannara)

=== The Heritage of Shannara ===
The next four books consist of The Scions of Shannara, The Druid of Shannara, The Elf Queen of Shannara and The Talismans of Shannara. These books are known as The Heritage of Shannara, are set 300 years after The Original Shannara Trilogy.

=== The Voyage of the Jerle Shannara ===
The Voyage of the Jerle Shannara trilogy consists of the books Ilse Witch, Antrax, and Morgawr. It is set 130 years after the Heritage of Shannara.

=== High Druid of Shannara ===
The High Druid of Shannara trilogy includes the novels Jarka Ruus, Tanequil, and Straken. It is set 20 years after the Voyage of the Jerle Shannara.

=== The Dark Legacy of Shannara ===
This trilogy is set 100 to 120 years after the events in Straken, consists of Wards of Faerie, published August 21, 2012, Bloodfire Quest, published March 12, 2013, and Witch Wraith, published July 17, 2013.

=== The Defenders of Shannara ===
Set 100 years after the events in The Dark Legacy of Shannara trilogy. The three novels are loosely connected, stand-alone novels, described as the setup for the conclusion of the entire Shannara saga. The trilogy consists of The High Druid's Blade (published July 15, 2014), The Darkling Child (published June 9, 2015), and The Sorcerer's Daughter (published May 24, 2016).

=== The Fall of Shannara ===
The Fall of Shannara is a four-book series, set over 200 years after "The Sorcerer's Daughter", that concludes the overall story arc of the Shannara universe. It is described as the chronological end, but not necessarily the last stories to be published. It begins with The Black Elfstone, which was published on June 13, 2017. The second book, The Skaar Invasion, was published on June 18, 2018. The third book, The Stiehl Assassin, was published in June 2019. The fourth and final book, The Last Druid, was released on October 20, 2020.

== Short stories ==
- Paladins of Shannara #1 – Allanon's Quest: An e-book short story set directly before The Sword of Shannara, re-published in Unfettered III: New Tales by Masters of Fantasy.
- Paladins of Shannara #2 – The Weapons Master's Choice: An e-book short story set sometime before The Wishsong of Shannara.
- Paladins of Shannara #3 – The Black Irix: An e-book short story set soon after The Sword of Shannara.
- Indomitable: A short story published in the anthology Legends II, set a few years after The Wishsong of Shannara.
- The Dark Wraith of Shannara: A graphic novel that shows part of the events of Indomitable, along with a continuation of the story.
- Walker and the Shade of Allanon: A short story published in Unfettered: New Tales by Masters of Fantasy, that takes place during Chapter 8 of The Ilse Witch.
- Imaginary Friends: A Word/Void short story published in anthology Once Upon a Time: A Treasury of Modern Fairy Tales, re-published in Unfettered: New Tales by Masters of Fantasy

== Chronology ==
1. Imaginary Friends (1991)
2. Running with the Demon (1997)
3. A Knight of the Word (1998)
4. Angel Fire East (1999)
5. Warrior (2018)
6. Armageddon's Children (2006)
7. The Elves of Cintra (2007)
8. The Gypsy Morph (2008)
9. The Bearers of the Black Staff (2010)
10. The Measure of the Magic (2011)
11. Galaphile (2025)
12. Brona (2026)
13. The First King of Shannara (1996)
14. Allanon's Quest (2012)
15. The Sword of Shannara (1977)
16. The Black Irix (2013)
17. The Elfstones of Shannara (1982)
18. "Aftermath" (2021)
19. The Weapons Master's Choice (2013)
20. The Wishsong of Shannara (1985)
21. Indomitable (2003)
22. The Dark Wraith of Shannara (graphic novel) (2008)
23. The Scions of Shannara (1990)
24. The Druid of Shannara (1991)
25. The Elf Queen of Shannara (1992)
26. The Talismans of Shannara (1993)
27. The "Last Ride" (2021)
28. Ilse Witch (2000)
29. Walker and the Shade of Allanon (2013) - takes place during chapter 8 of Ilse Witch
30. Antrax (2001)
31. Morgawr (2002)
32. Jarka Ruus (2003)
33. Tanequil (2004)
34. Straken (2005)
35. Wards of Faerie (2012)
36. Bloodfire Quest (2013)
37. Witch Wraith (2013)
38. The High Druid's Blade (2014)
39. The Darkling Child (2015)
40. The Sorcerer's Daughter (2016)
41. The Black Elfstone (2017)
42. The Skaar Invasion (2018)
43. The Stiehl Assassin (2019)
44. The Last Druid (2020)

== Television and film rights ==
In 2007, Warner Bros. optioned the film rights to the Shannara universe for producer Dan Farah, but the rights deal expired in 2010 and all rights reverted to Terry Brooks.

Farah Films partnered with Sonar Entertainment to acquire TV rights to the Shannara universe in 2012. In December, 2013 it was announced an epic TV series based on the books was being produced for MTV. The series is produced by Dan Farah, Jon Favreau, and Smallville showrunners Miles Millar and Al Gough, and Jonathan Liebesman. During the Shannara Chronicles panel at San Diego Comic Con in July 2015, a teaser trailer was revealed, giving audiences a first look at the sets and characters. A television version of the trailer was shown during the 2015 MTV Music Awards. The series premiered January 5, 2016. Season 2 began airing on Spike in October 2017.

On January 16, 2018, it was announced that the series had been cancelled after two seasons. Producers later announced that the series is being shopped to other networks. The series was later considered officially concluded.
