= The Druid of Shannara =

1991 novel by Terry Brooks

- First edition
- Author: Terry Brooks
- Cover artist: Keith Parkinson
- Language: English
- Series: Heritage of Shannara
- Genre: Fantasy
- Publisher: Del Rey Books
- Publication date: March 1991
- Publication place: United States
- Media type: Print (hardback & paperback)
- Pages: 423 pp (hardcover) 384 pp (paperback)
- ISBN: 0-345-36298-5 (hardcover) ISBN 0-345-37559-9 (paperback)
- OCLC: 22119181
- Dewey Decimal: 813/.54 20
- LC Class: PS3552.R6596 D7 1991
- Preceded by: The Scions of Shannara
- Followed by: The Elf Queen of Shannara

The Druid of Shannara is a fantasy novel by American writer Terry Brooks. The second book of his tetralogy of The Heritage of Shannara, it was first published in 1991.

== Plot summary ==
The Druid of Shannara takes off where The Scions of Shannara ended, focusing on the story of Walker Boh as he pursues the task given to him by the shade of Allanon: returning the Druid castle of Paranor to the Four Lands. Left in the Hall of Kings with the Asphinx attacking, Walker fends off the poison with his magic for days. Finally realizing that there is only one way out of his predicament, he breaks off his arm in terrible agony. He fights his way through the Hall of Kings and makes his way to Storlock for the Gnome Healers to help him heal.

The reader is told that Coll is still alive, and the thing Par killed was a fake. Coll is kept in a prison called Southwatch and trying to figure out an escape.

Elsewhere, The King of the Silver River realizes the state of the Four Lands and makes a woman out of the elements surrounding him in his garden. The King tells this daughter, Quickening, of a task he wants her to carry out in a troubled lost city to the north and the people he wants her to bring.

Morgan Leah returns to Culhaven to carry out a final request from his old friend Steff who met his demise in The Scions of Shannara, only to be imprisoned.

Rimmer Dall learns about Quickening and rumors surrounding her appearances. That she's the daughter of The King of the Silver River and makes miracles happen. Rimmer Dall dispatches the assassin Pe Ell to kill her.

When Quickening arrives in Culhaven, she restores hope in the land by bringing back the beautiful Meade Gardens. Doing this takes a toll on her, and she falls weakened into Pe Ell's arms. He helps her find somewhere to sleep but doesn't murder her, immediately struggling with attraction to her.

After Quickening recovers she requests Pe Ell to break Morgan Leah out of prison and he does so, reluctantly. Morgan Leah is also instantly smitten by Quickening, and along with Pe Ell agrees to journey with her. The three set off to find Walker Boh.

Meanwhile, Walker has returned home under the care of Cogline. Still weak, he lies in bed as Cogline tries to coax him to get up and regard his survival positively. Rimmer Dall with a handful of Shadowen confront Cogline, bound to take out the last of the messengers of the druids. Cogline had been warned by Allanon and displaced the Druid Histories before he and Rumor are killed.

Soon after, Quickening reaches Walker Boh and heals him the best she can, his arm still missing. She leads the party north to get the black elfstone and promising that in return, Morgan will get his sword back, Pe Ell will increase his magical abilities, and Walker Boh will become whole.

On their way, they meet Horner Dees who is the only known survivor from entering Eldwist, an ancient city turned entirely into stone. He had no intentions of ever going back but is persuaded. They finally arrive at Eldwist and unsuccessfully address Uhl Belk, a brother of The King of the Silver River who has been around just as long. Days go by avoiding a creeper called The Rake, and the Maw Grint - the child of the Stone King and a gigantic worm-like creature that turns everything to stone. When the group eventually gets Uhl Belk to yield the black elfstone, Pe Ell takes off with Quickening as a hostage. The others catch up as Pe Ell stabs Quickening, though the reader is informed that she pushes herself against Pe Ell's magical blade, taking the choice to kill away from the assassin. Surprised, confused and enraged, Pe Ell flees but soon dies for his involvement in Quickening's death, supposedly from retaliatory magic that Walker suggests was placed on Quickening by the King of the Silver River to avenge her.

Walker Boh, Morgan Leah, and Horner Dees take Quickening to the cliffs above Eldwist. She tells Morgan to sheath the broken Sword of Leah in the earth. Using magic, she communicates to Walker the purpose for her existence is to restore Eldwist, freeing it from its stone curse. At her request, Walker releases Quickening and she falls from the edge of the cliff and disintegrates. The dust of her body settles over Eldwist and plant life instantly sprouts, covering the whole peninsula and leaving only the dome building wherein Uhl Belk resides, in stone. The magic proceeds to restore the broken Sword of Leah.

The three men leave, taking different paths: Horner goes home, Morgan sets off to find Par and Walker Boh to recover lost Paranor.

Mentioned briefly in the book, Wren journeys with Garth to the village of Grimpen Ward in the Wilderun to seek the seer called the Addershag, hoping to learn the fate of the Elves. Wren is told by the Addershag to go south to the Blue Divide and light a fire for three days above the caves of the Rocs. Wren and Garth escape Grimpen Ward, chased by the men who have been keeping the Addershag as a prisoner.

== Reception ==
The Druid of Shannara has received mixed reviews. A review in Kirkus commented that there is "some quite lively plotting, but set forth in an abstracted, rather slapdash fashion that will not deter Shannara fans but will certainly prevent more discerning readers from taking Brooks seriously." In contrast, a review in Hot Off the Shelves said that the "adventure is the best in the Shannara series so far."

== Characters ==
- Walker Boh
- Morgan Leah
- [Quickening]
- Pe Ell
- Horner Dees
- Uhl Belk
- King of the Silver River
- Carisman
- Maw Grint
- Cogline
- Wren Elessedil
- Garth
- Par Ohmsford
- Coll Ohmsford
- Rimmer Dall
