= Legends II =

Legends II may refer to:

- Legends II (book), a 2003 anthology of fantasy short stories
- X-Men Legends II: Rise of Apocalypse, a 2005 action role-playing game
