= The Black Irix =

Black Irix
- First edition
- Author: Terry Brooks
- Cover artist: Stephen Youll
- Language: English
- Series: Paladins of Shannara
- Genre: Fantasy
- Publisher: Del Rey Books
- Publication date: June 3, 2013
- Publication place: United States
- Media type: eBook
- Pages: 42 pp
- Preceded by: The Sword of Shannara
- Followed by: The Elfstones of Shannara

"The Black Irix" is a fantasy short story by Terry Brooks in his Shannara series. It is the third in a trilogy of short stories that make up the Paladins of Shannara series, first published in 2013.

== Plot summary ==
A year after the events of The Sword of Shannara, Shea has become very ill. Fearing for his life, Flick goes to a woods witch and seer named Audrana Coos. She gives him a small bottle of liquid and tells him to give it to Shea secretly. She also tells him that Shea will soon go on another quest and that Flick should not dissuade him. Flick does not believe her, but he slips the liquid into Shea’s ale later and the next day Shea’s health has completely recovered. Later Flick tells Shea about the woods witch and Shea thanks him and assures him that he will not be going on any quests or leaving the Vale again. Then Panamon Creel arrives.

Creel tells Shea that the Black Irix that Keltset the rock troll used to save their lives and was lost when he was killed has been acquired by a collector of rare artifacts called Kestra Chule. He tells Shea that he must use the power of the elfstones to help him find and recover it so that he can return it to his fallen comrade’s family. Reluctantly, Shea agrees. Creel and Shea set off, but Flick refuses to accompany them, angry that Shea is leaving with the untrustworthy Creel. However, Flick catches up with them later. Shea then uses the elfstones to discover that the Black Irix is hidden in a vault in Kestra Chule’s private quarters within his fortress. Flick questions Creel as to how he expects to gain entry into this fortress. Creel informs them that Chule is actually a good acquaintance, and that they have been invited. When they arrive at the fortress, they indeed are invited in and given a great feast, after which Chule has his guards put the Ohmsfords in chains. Creel then takes the elfstones off of Shea and presents them to Chule in exchange for a hefty sack of gold. Chule promises to lock the brothers up overnight and release them in the morning, perhaps…

Flick is angry that Shea trusted Creel despite his warnings, but in the early morning hours the Ohmsford brother’s cell door opens and there stands Panamon Creel. He had worried that Chule would kill them to keep the Elves from learning he had the elfstones. Shea refuses to leave without the elfstones, to which Creel responds by handing them back. Creel then convinces the guards to let them go. On the road Creel informs the brothers that Chule had told him he had acquired the Black Irix and needed somewhere to store it. Creel suggested a vault maker to build a vault for him. Later he paid the vault maker a large sum of gold for the backup combo. He then needed a reason for Chule to let him get close. So the elfstones served two purposes. They convinced Chule to let him in so that he could buy the elfstones. They also helped him find the vault. He reveals that after the brothers had been confined, he slipped some sleeping potion into Chule’s drink, and while he slept, stole the Black Irix, and the elfstones back. Shea dismays over the fact that Chule will surely come after Creel, but Panamon says he is not that easy to find. He then sends the brothers on their way home, and heads off to return the Black Irix to Keltset's family.

== Characters ==
The characters are:

- Shea Ohmsford, Flick's adopted brother and the only remaining descendant of Jerle Shannara.
- Flick Ohmsford, Shea's brother.
- Audrana Coos, a woods witch and seer.
- Panamon Creel, a one-handed "con man" wanderer whose left hand is now a pike. He saved Shea from a patrol of Gnomes.
- Keltset Mallicos, Panamon's mute companion, killed saving his companions on their quest to destroy the Warlock Lord.
- Kestra Chule, a collector of rare artifacts.
