= The Weapon Master's Choice =

The Weapon Master’s Choice
- First edition
- Author: Terry Brooks
- Cover artist: Stephen Youll
- Language: English
- Series: Paladins of Shannara
- Genre: Fantasy
- Publisher: Del Rey Books
- Publication date: June 20, 2013
- Publication place: United States
- Media type: eBook
- Pages: 40 pp
- Preceded by: The Elfstones of Shannara
- Followed by: The Wishsong of Shannara

"The Weapon Master’s Choice" is a fantasy short story by Terry Brooks in his Shannara series. It is the second in a trilogy of short stories that make up the Paladins of Shannara series, first published in 2013.

== Plot summary ==
The story begins when Garet Jax is found in the forest by the beautiful and mysterious Lyriana. She persuades him that he must travel with her to Tajarin on the coast to save her people from a dracul named Kronswiff who feeds on souls. Garet Jax knows she is keeping something from him, but is strangely attracted to her and compelled to help. That night she shares his camp, and in the dark of night Garet Jax awakens to a threatening feeling, only to find Lyriana already awake. Three masked men attack and Garet easily kills them. The next day they buy provisions for their 8 day journey and set off.

When they arrive at the town Garet Jax is surprised by what he sees. Tajarin is a crumbling ruin. It looks deserted except for the guards, called Hets. He and Lyriana stay hidden, and enter a building where he witnesses Kronswiff sucking the souls out of his helpless victims. Garet Jax knows he should wait until Kronswiff and the Hets retire so as to attack unawares, but he cannot bear to watch one more person drained of their soul and thrown into a cart, a lifeless bit of sagging flesh. He silently kills two Hets, then throws a dagger into Kronswiffs heart. The dracul does not perish, and Garet Jax realizes that he must behead the monster. He attacks and kills the Hets, and while doing so feels Lyriana using magic to block their blows from him. He kills them all then swings a deadly blow at Kronswiff, taking off his hands and head in one fell swoop.

Garet Jax and Lyriana then leave to free her captive people. He is disgusted to find them disfigured and sick, and demands to know what Kronswiff did to them. He realizes too late that they were already like that. Tajarin is a leper colony. Lyriana offers him gold for his service, but he says that he wants her. She says it can never be and reveals that she too is a leper. She has some magic that she uses to heal herself, but the sickness is getting worse. Her parents and brother were lepers and she had accompanied them to the colony to help care for them, but by the time they died she had contracted the disease. He kisses her and leaves in despair, but quickly forgets her as he looks for his next adventure, knowing that they could never have been.

== Characters ==
The characters are:

- Garet Jax is a renowned Weapons Master, skilled in every weapon known to man.
- Lyriana is a mysterious young lady from Tajarin.
- Kronswiff is a dracul that feeds on people’s souls.
