= Morgawr =

Morgawr may refer to:

- Morgawr (folklore), a sea serpent hoax
- Morgawr (novel), a 2002 fantasy novel by Terry Brooks
