= Indomitable (short story) =

Short story by Terry Brooks

- 2012 Subterranean Press edition cover
- Author: Terry Brooks
- Language: English
- Genre: Fantasy
- Published: Legends II (collection)
- Publisher: Del Rey Books
- Publication date: December 30, 2003
- Publication place: United States
- Media type: Print/E-book
- ISBN: 0-345-45644-0
- Preceded by: The Wishsong of Shannara
- Followed by: Dark Wraith of Shannara

"Indomitable" is a fantasy short story by Terry Brooks in his Shannara series, and takes place two years after the events in The Wishsong of Shannara. It was first published in the 2003 collection Legends II.

== Plot summary ==
Two years after the events chronicled in The Wishsong of Shannara, Kimber Boh finds Jair Ohmsford working in his parents' inn while they are away. She tells him of a dream that has been haunting Cogline where the shade of the fallen Druid Allanon comes to him and tells him that a page from the Ildatch was not destroyed, and that Jair must destroy it. Jair is unconvinced, but agrees to travel to Hearthstone with Kimber and meet with Cogline. The first night Jair is there the shade of Allanon tells him that he must travel to the lair of the Mwellrets, Dun Fee Aran, and destroy the remaining page of the Ildatch before its power grows. The three companions journey to Dun Fee Aran, and along the way encounter a peddler who warns them against going there. Jair struggles with his own fears of going back to the place where he was once imprisoned by the lizard-like Mwellrets.

Once they arrive, Jair slips sleeping medication into Cogline and Kimber Boh's ale, so that he may enter the fortress alone. Jair uses his Wishsong to disguise himself and gain entry. He conjures up an illusion of Allanon which sends the Mwellrets into a panic, then follows one to the chamber where the remaining Ildatch page is guarded. He tries to pick up the page, but it burns him and he howls, giving away his presence. The Mwellrets search for him, and get close, and as he conjures up an illusion of warriors the Mwellrets quickly see through the illusion. Jair desperately conjures an illusion of the weapons master Garet Jax which he also inhabits, endowing him with Jax's fighting abilities. He slaughters the Mwellrets and destroy the Ildatch page. He then returns to himself and escapes the fortress, now knowing that his Wishsong is much more powerful than he had realized.

== Characters ==
- Jair Ohmsford is the son of Wil Ohmsford and born with the magic of the wishsong.
- Kimber Boh is the adopted daughter of Cogline.
- Cogline is an old man who was once part of the Druid order.

== Other characters mentioned ==
- Allanon is a Druid shade, after being killed in The Wishsong of Shannara.
- Brin Ohmsford, is the daughter of Wil Ohmsford and born with the magic of the wishsong.
- Garet Jax is a renowned Weapons Master and skilled in every weapon known to man; killed in The Wishsong of Shannara.
- Slanter is a gnome.
- Whisper is a moor cat.
