= Antrax =

2001 book by Terry Brooks

- Cover art of Antrax.
- Author: Terry Brooks
- Language: English
- Series: The Voyage of the Jerle Shannara
- Genre: Fantasy
- Publisher: Del Rey Books
- Publication date: 18 September 2001
- Publication place: United States
- Media type: Print (Hardcover)
- Pages: 375
- ISBN: 0-345-39766-5
- OCLC: 45827849
- Dewey Decimal: 813/.54 21
- LC Class: PS3552.R6596 V69 2001
- Preceded by: Ilse Witch
- Followed by: Morgawr

Antrax is the second book in Terry Brooks' The Voyage of the Jerle Shannara fantasy trilogy. It was first published in 2001.

== Plot ==
The voyage to find the books of lost magic takes the companions to the continent of Parkasia. Here, they are split up, and Walker, despite all his plans and his enormous power, finds himself caught and trapped by an unseen force, a supercomputer artificial intelligence built by the ancient humans, known as "Antrax". Antrax was created to store data and information from its time and it is given a duty, an order to protect the information that it holds. However, when the Great War broke out, the last of its creators returned, and gave Antrax its final task: protect the information at all costs, no matter what the price. Antrax then began to build its own arsenal of defense mechanisms that includes lasers and various sentry and maintenance robots collectively referred to as "Creepers" by the characters that encounter them.

Above Castledown, the crew of the Jerle Shannara find themselves besieged by evil forces, and the Ilse Witch confronts the Druid's protégé, Bek Ohmsford, who claims that she is actually Grianne Ohmsford, and that he is the brother she last saw as an infant - now a young man who carries the Sword of Shannara and wields the magic of the wishsong. Truls Rohk keeps protecting Bek buying him time till the Ilse Witch finally takes up the Sword of Shannara to realize the truth of her life.

In parallel plot Ahren Elessedil works his way in retrieving the lost elf stones, also Quentin Leah with the help of locals finally are able to kill the minion created by Antrax.

Meanwhile, Walker realizes that the 'magic books' they have been searching for is actually the science of the Old World, stored on Antrax, which could be used to rebuild society with new technology. But there is no practical way to access this information, so Walker chooses to destroy the power-hungry computer A.I., which is quickly becoming a danger to the whole world. However, he is mortally wounded in the process. In the end a fleet of airships reach Parkasia under leadership of Morgawr willing to kill all left of the company and take the magic for himself.

It is believed that Antrax was in fact initially known as Oronyx Experimental and appears in The Elves of Cintra.

== Main characters ==
The main characters are:

- Walker Boh
- Ahren Elessedil
- Redden Alt Mer
- Rue Meridian
- Bek Rowe
