= Ilse Witch =

2000 novel by Terry Brooks

- Cover
- Author: Terry Brooks
- Language: English
- Series: The Voyage of the Jerle Shannara
- Genre: High fantasy
- Publisher: Del Rey Books
- Publication date: 5 September 2000
- Publication place: United States
- Media type: Print (Hardcover)
- Pages: 464
- ISBN: 0-345-39654-5
- OCLC: 43798457
- Dewey Decimal: 813/.54 21
- LC Class: PS3552.R6596 I84 2000
- Preceded by: The Talismans of Shannara
- Followed by: Antrax

Ilse Witch is a fantasy novel by American writer Terry Brooks, the first book in The Voyage of the Jerle Shannara fantasy trilogy. First published in 2000, it was the first novel in which Brooks described the use of futuristic technology, including airships as well as robots and lasers from the Old World. A conversation between the Druid Walker Boh and the Shade of Allanon that was edited from Ilse Witch was published as part of Unfettered, a collection of fantasy short stories.

== Plot summary ==
Set 130 years after the events of the Heritage of Shannara series, the Free-born and the Federation are still at war. The story follows a quest organized by Walker Boh, the last surviving Shannara Druid. Thirty years before the story begins, the Elven prince Kael Elessedil led an expedition in search of a legendary magic which was said to be the most ancient and powerful in the world.

At the beginning of the narrative, Kael is found floating in the sea of the Blue Divide; a map is found with him, covered with mysterious symbols. Walker is the only man who can read them, save for the Ilse Witch, a twisted young woman who is as practiced in magic as Walker himself. She will stop at nothing to possess the map and the magic it leads to. Walker sets out to find the magic first.

Thus begins the voyage of the airship Jerle Shannara. The company chosen by Walker must fly into the face of unknown terrors while the Ilse Witch and her dark allies pursue.

== Main characters ==
The main characters are:

- Bek Ohmsford
- Ilse Witch (Grianne Ohmsford)
- Quentin Leah
- Walker Boh
- Ahren Elessedil
- Panax
- Cree Bega
- Ryer Ord Star
- Morgawr
- Redden Alt Mer
- Rue Meridian
- Hunter Predd
- Truls Rohk
