= Brona =

Brona may be:

- Brona, a variant of the given name Bronagh
- Brona, a legendary Anglo-Saxon king, son of Baeldaeg, son of Woden, ancestor of the kings of Wessex
- Brona, a fictitious character from The Sword of Shannara
- Brona Croft, later known as Lily Frankenstein, a character on Showtime's Penny Dreadful
