= Morgawr (novel) =

2002 novel by Terry Brooks

- Cover art of Morgawr.
- Author: Terry Brooks
- Language: English
- Series: The Voyage of the Jerle Shannara
- Genre: Fantasy novel
- Publisher: Del Rey Books
- Publication date: 2 September 2002
- Publication place: United States
- Media type: Print (Hardcover)
- Pages: 401 pp
- ISBN: 0-345-43572-9
- OCLC: 49664548
- Dewey Decimal: 813/.54 21
- LC Class: PS3552.R6596 M67 2002
- Preceded by: Antrax
- Followed by: Jarka Ruus

Morgawr is the third book in the Voyage of the Jerle Shannara fantasy trilogy by Terry Brooks. It was first published in 2002 by Del Rey Books.

== Plot summary ==
The Morgawr is a centuries-old sorcerer of unimaginable might, who feeds upon the souls of his enemies. With a fleet of airships and a crew of walking dead men at his command, he is in relentless pursuit of the Jerle Shannara. His goal is twofold: to find and control the fabled 'magic' of Parkasia, and to destroy the Ilse Witch (his disciple) to keep her from using the magic to destroy him. He gets more annoyed when Ahren Elessedil escapes his imprisonment and the seer, Ryer Ord Star is able to lead him astray as directed by Walker even at his death.

When Walker Boh persuades the witch to use the Sword of Shannara, she is exposed to its awesome power and forced to confront the truth of her horrifying deeds as the Ilse Witch, causing her to flee deep into her own mind. She has only one protector: her brother Bek, who is determined to redeem her. In the last stand taken by crew of Jerle Shannara, Redden Alt Mer alone destroys all of Morgawr's fleet after stealing the lead ship and using it against them. Bek and Rue kills the company of mwellret led by Cree Bega, while Cree Bega is killed by Ahren Elessedil. Bek finally reaches the confrontation of Grianne and Morgawr to find his sister already in trouble and triggers a feeble magic of his wish-song just enough to raise the spirit of castle, hence destroys the Morgawr.

They go home to the Four Lands. But rather than going home with Bek, Grianne Ohmsford will be going now to Paranor, for Walker charged her with a very important task before he died: she is to foster a new Druid order.

== Main characters ==
The main characters are:

- Bek Ohmsford
- Grianne Ohmsford
- Quentin Leah
- Walker Boh
- Ahren Elessedil
- Truls Rohk
- Panax
- Cree Bega
- Ryer Ord Star
- Morgawr
- Redden Alt Mer
- Rue Meridian
- Hunter Predd
- Po Kelles
