= The Stiehl Assassin =

2019 book by Terry Brooks

- Cover art of The Stiehl Assassin
- Author: Terry Brooks
- Cover artist: Mike Bryan based on a photograph by Michael Frost
- Language: English
- Series: The Fall of Shannara
- Genre: Fantasy
- Publisher: Del Rey Books
- Publication date: May 28, 2019
- Publication place: United States
- Media type: Mass Market Paperback
- Pages: 480 pp
- ISBN: 978-0-553-39156-5
- Preceded by: The Skaar Invasion
- Followed by: The Last Druid

The Stiehl Assassin is a 2019 fantasy novel by Terry Brooks in his Shannara series. It is the third book in the Fall of Shannara series and was a New York Times bestselling novel.

== Plot summary ==
The novel picks up where The Skaar Invasion left off, with Tavo plunging the Stiehl blade into his sister Tarsha's back, but it turns out she is only a magical illusion and Tavo is quickly disarmed. In the scuffle, the evil Clizia Porse retrieves the Stiehl Blade and escapes. The druid Drisker Arc fashions a magical collar and places it around Tavo's neck so he cannot call up the Wishsong. Drisker decides to consult the dead at the Hadeshorn to see what to do about Clizia Porse. He tries to summon Allanon, but ends up summoning Grianne Ohmsford. She is still trapped in The Forbidding, but has figured out how to communicate through the Hadeshorn. She agrees to help him if he will return her to the young woman she was before she entered into the service of the Mother Tanequil. He agrees, and she tells him that Shea Ohmsford is the key. Using the Elfstones, they find Shea.

Cor d’Amphere, king of the Skaar, arrives at the front lines of the Skaar Invasion and relieves his daughter Ajin d’Amphere of command, sending her back to Skaarsland. Cor commands Ajin's second in command and confidant (who secretly loves her), Kol’Dre, known as The Penetrator, to stay with him. Cor meets with the Federation Prime Minister, Ketter Vause, and demands to keep the lands they have conquered. Vause agrees and has his assistant Belladrin Rish draw up the agreement and take it to the Skaar king. Later, Belladrin Rish goes to the Dwarves and enlists Battenhyle, Lakodan, and a company of dwarves to come to the Skaar battlefront with their machine, The Revealer, in exchange for a release from conscripting of dwarves into the Federation army for 50 years.

En route to Skaarsland the ship carrying Ajin crashes. Jor’ Alt, commanded by Ajin's step-mother (The Pretender), attempts to assassinate Ajin, but she kills him. She is then rescued by Darcon (Dar) Leah and Tarsha. Ajin pursues Dar romantically, and they begin to fall in love.

Clizia Porse sneaks into the Skaar camp and makes an alliance with the king. She convinces him to send her and a complement of soldiers to claim Paranor for Skaarsland, but the guardian kills her guards and chases her from the keep. She knows now that Drisker has convinced the guardian that she is a threat, and no longer a druid. She decides she must destroy Drisker to reverse this. She returns to the Skaar king and suggests that she will kill the Elf king, Gerrendren Elessedil, and the Federation Prime Minister, Ketter Vause, to distract them from the war effort, giving the Skaar an advantage in battle.

Shea Ohmsford rescues Tindall from the Assidian Deep prison, but they are tracked back to their hideout by Commander Zakonis. Seelah rescues them, killing Zakonis’ men, but leaving him bound. Shea decides to accompany Rocan Arneas and his cousin Sartren Longlet aboard the giant airship Behemoth carrying the weather changing machine, Annabelle. He learns about Annabelle from Tindall during their journey. Shea breaks his promise not to reveal Annabelle and tells Drisker Arc about it. Drisker demands that Behemoth take Annabelle to Skaarsland to try to end the long winter that has caused them to invade the Four Lands in search of a warmer home. Rocan reluctantly agrees.

Drisker, Tarsha, and Tavo return to the Hadeshorn, where Drisker tries to summon Grianne again, but this time summons Allanon. Allanon confirms that Grianne's advice was sound and then has Drisker anoint Tarsha with water from the Hadeshorn (thought to be deadly). They do not tell her why. They then return to Paranor to use the waters of the Scrye Bowl to find Clizia Porse, finding her in Arborlon, the Elven Capital City. Tavo is visited by Fluken and has a meltdown.

Clizia Porse sneaks into the Palace at Arborlon and beheads the Elven king with the Stiehl Blade, but the use of the magic leaves her drained. After several days of recovery, she sneaks into the Federation Camp to assassinate the Prime Minister, but Drisker anticipated this after the assassination of the Elven king and stops her, but she escapes. Tavo finds her but is unable to use the Wishsong to stop her since he is still wearing Drisker's collar.

Fearing for his life, Ketter Vause orders an attack on the Skaar encampment, only to find it abandoned. The Skaar flank the Federation and attack while the majority of the Federation force is deployed. The Federation use the Reveals, which sprays a neon-like liquid on the invisible Skaar soldiers, revealing them. The Skaar had learned of the Revealer in advance, so they wear cloaks to catch most of the liquid, and then discard the cloaks. It makes the Revealer less effective, but still renders the Skaar soldiers invisibility less effective. The Federation prevails in battle.

Meanwhile, the Behemoth suffers damage in a storm and is forced to land on an Island called Nambizi, one of the nine islands off the coast of Nambia, according to Ajin. Dar and Ajin are attacked by a giant rhinoceros, that is called off by a black boy, who then signals for them to leave. Shea hears this story and sneaks off at night to meet the boy. They exchange names, the boy is called Borshawk, but a language barrier prohibits further communication. Shea says "friends," and conveys the meaning by shaking his hand. Later that nite, Behemoth is attacked by black men riding giant bat-like creatures. Ajin and Dar board a Sprint and counterattack. The attackers flee, while Ajin and Dar pursue, but their Sprint loses power and crashes near a fleet of enemy ships.

Cor d’Amphere asks Kol’Dre to assassinate Ketter Vause in exchange for Ajin's hand in marriage. Kol agrees, and kills Vause, but is then killed by Belladrin Rish who says "Cor d’Amphere thanks you greatly for your service," revealing that she is a Skaar spy.

Clizia Porse sets a trap for Drisker Arc at the Cleeg Hold, and brews Nightshade to send him to the Forbidding. She succeeds. She then attacks Tarsha, sending her falling from a cliff. Freed from his collar, Tavo attacks with the Wishsong, but Clizia counterattacks, and slits his throat. As the novel closes, it is revealed that the use of the Nightshade exchanged Drisker with a Jachyra from the Forbidding.

== Characters ==
The characters are:

- Ajin d’Amphere is a princess from the island nation of Skaarsland near the continent of Eurodia, and daughter of Cor d’Amphere.
- Allanon is a Druid who has been dead for hundreds of years and resides in the Netherworld.
- Annabelle is a machine that can allegedly change the weather. Tindall thinks she is alive.
- Battenhyle is a dwarf commander that runs The Revealer.
- Belladrin Rish is personal assistant to Ketter Vause.
- Brecon Elessedil is an Elven prince, fourth son of King Gerrendren Elesedil.
- Borshawk is a black boy on the island of Nambizi, that controls a giant rhinoceros.
- Clizia Porse is an evil Druid with plans to take over Paranor as Ard Rhys of a new Druid Order.
- Cor d’Amphere is king of the Skaar.
- Darcon (Dar) Leah is the High Druid's Blade, the commander of the guard at Paranor.
- Fluken is Tavo's evil, imaginary friend.
- Gerrendren Elessedil is the king of the Elves.
- Grianne Ohmsford also known as the Ilse Witch, is a former Ard Rhys of Paranor, former spirit of the Mother Tanequil, and current prisoner in the Forbidding.
- Ketter Vause is the Federation Prime Minister.
- Kol’Dre formerly known as Kassen, but now revealed to be The Penetrator of the Skaar, is the closest advisor to Ajin d’Amphere, whom he secretly loves, despite being lowborn.
- Lakodan is a dwarf commander that runs The Revealer.
- Paranor is the Druid Keep.
- The Pretender is Ajin d’Amphere's evil step-mother.
- The Revealer is a weapon that disrupts Skaar soldiers invisibility.
- Rocan Arneas is the financier of Annabelle.
- Seelah is a beautiful cat-like shapeshifter, that can be invisible.
- Tarsha Kaynin is sister to Tavo, Wishsong wielder and student of Drisker Arc.
- Tavo Kaynin is a madman in possession of a lethal form of Wishsong.
- Tindall is the inventor of Annabelle, using Old World science.
- Zakonis is a federation commander.

== Reception ==
Publishers Weekly wrote that in "the penultimate chapter of Brooks’s venerable Shannara epic fantasy series… both the storyline and characters fail to engage, despite the high stakes involved", and lamented that the Shannara series "seems poised to go out with a whimper."

Lloyde Arickson of IGV Publishing wrote that "in the previous two books in this series, a lot of time was spent bringing players into place and setting up introductions," but in "The Stiehl Assassin, the plot definitely accelerates." Arickson goes on to say that Brooks has succeeded in making "the Skaar the most interesting player in the Four Lands."

The book entered The New York Times Best Seller list in June 2019.
