= Heritage of Shannara =

Novel series by Terry Brooks

The Heritage of Shannara
- The Heritage of Shannara book cover
- The Scions of Shannara (1990); The Druid of Shannara (1991); The Elf Queen of Shannara (1992); The Talismans of Shannara (1993)
- Author: Terry Brooks
- Cover artist: Keith Parkinson
- Country: United States
- Language: English
- Genre: Epic fantasy
- Publisher: Del Rey Books
- Published: March 1990 – March 1993
- Media type: Print (hardback & paperback)
- No. of books: 4

The Heritage of Shannara is a series of four fantasy novels by Terry Brooks, set hundreds of years after the original Shannara trilogy. Unlike the original trilogy, however, this series is all one, cohesive story, in contrast to the three isolated stories of the originals. It is set in a future Four Lands in which the Federation of the Southland has driven off the Elves, enslaved the Dwarves, and outlawed magic. Only the rebel Free-born, led by Padishar Creel, dare to resist. The series begins with The Scions of Shannara (1990), when the Ohmsford descendants are summoned by the shade of Allanon to combat the Shadowen that have been poisoning the land, each charged with a quest only they can embark on. The story continues with The Druid of Shannara (1991), The Elf Queen of Shannara (1992), and concludes with The Talismans of Shannara (1993).

== Plot Synopses ==
=== The Scions of Shannara ===
The shade of the Druid Allanon delivers three quests to the three Scions: Par Ohmsford must find the lost Sword of Shannara, Par's uncle Walker Boh must restore the lost keep of Paranor and its Druids, and Par's cousin Wren Ohmsford must restore the lost race of the Elves. The novel then focuses on Par's travels with his brother and Coll Ohmsford and his friend Morgan Leah as they attempt to retrieve the Sword of Shannara. The book ends with all three Scions in peril.

=== The Druid of Shannara ===
The second novel mainly follows Walker Boh, as he reluctantly searches for the Black Elfstone, which has the power to restore the Druids and their keep, Paranor. The Black Elfstone has been stolen by the Stone King, an ancient being who seeks to turn the world to stone. On this quest, Walker is assisted by Quickening, the beautiful daughter of the King of the Silver River; she is the subject of an assassination attempt. Meanwhile, Coll has been captured by the Shadowen.

=== The Elf Queen of Shannara ===
The third novel chronicles Wren Ohmsford's travels beyond the shores of the Westland in search of the lost Elven race. Wren and her companion, the deaf-mute giant Garth, discover the elves in their city of Arbolon. The elves are doubly threatened by evil beasts (kept out by a magical barrier) and the eruption of the volcanic island upon which Arbolon sits. Wren learns that she is an elf, granddaughter of the titular elf Queen Ellenroh, and accepts the task of returning Arbolon to the mainland concealed in a magic jewel. Meanwhile, Coll escapes the Shadowen but leads them to his brother Par. Walker becomes a Druid and discovers their keep, Paranor.

=== The Talismans of Shannara ===
The last novel details the final conflict between the Ohmsfords and the Shadowen monsters that have overtaken the Four Lands. It begins with all three having completed their assigned quests, but facing severe challenges. Par believes he is responsible for his brother's death; Walker has been attacked at Paranor by Shadowen in the form of the Four Horsemen; and Wren, newly Queen of the Elves, faces an invading army. Rimmer Dall, leader of the Shadowen, orchestrates Wren's betrayal by a seeming friend. Coll is corrupted by a magical Shadowen cloak, and claims the Sword of Shannara which Par thought would be his. Par loses control of his magic powers and comes to believe he should join the Shadowen. Despite these conflicts, the Scions reunite, unite the Four Lands, and vanquish the evil Shadowen.

== Reception ==
Reviews in Kirkus were largely negative, criticizing each book as formulaic and unpolished, though the reviewers acknowledged that fans of the series would likely be satisfied. Fantasy Literature called Heritage of Shannara "Brooks’ best Shannara series". The final volume, Talismans of Shannara, was a Publishers Weekly bestseller for nine weeks.
