= The Skaar Invasion =

2018 fantasy novel by Terry Brooks

- Cover art of The Skaar Invasion
- Author: Terry Brooks
- Cover artist: Mike Bryan
- Language: English
- Series: The Fall of Shannara
- Genre: Fantasy
- Publisher: Del Rey Books
- Publication date: June 19, 2018
- Publication place: United States
- Media type: Mass Market Paperback
- Pages: 480 pp
- ISBN: 978-0-553-39153-4
- Preceded by: The Black Elfstone
- Followed by: The Stiehl Assassin

The Skaar Invasion is a 2018 fantasy novel by Terry Brooks, the second installment in his Fall of Shannara series.

== Plot summary ==
The novel picks up where The Black Elfstone left off. Darcon (Dar) Leah holds Ajin d'Amphere hostage, the Druids are dead, and Paranor has vanished. Ajin tells Dar that the Skaar invaded the Four Lands because their continent of Eurodia is dying, caught in an endless winter. They eliminated the Druids because they found them to be the biggest threat to their invasion, but she had meant to capture the magic of Paranor for Skaarsland. She had not anticipated Paranor vanishing and feels like a failure because it is gone. Feeling that he owes her for saving his own life, Dar allows Ajin to go free and she returns to the Skaar. Kol'Dre, in private musings, reveals that the Skaar ability to disappear is at least partly due to their genetic makeup. Ajin receives a message from her father, the king, that he is coming. She sends Kol'Dre to the Federation Prime Minister, Ketter Vause. Kol'Dre tells Vause of how the Skaar have destroyed tribes of Trolls and eliminated the Druids. He informs him that the Elves are next and suggests a non-intervention treaty between the Federation and the Skaar. Meanwhile, Ajin goes to the Elves and lies, telling them that they eliminated the Druids on behalf of the Federation. She now reveals that the Federation intends to attack the Elves and take all of their magic talismans, also a lie to pit the two against each other. She tells the Elven king and council that the Skaar only seek a new homeland and asks that the Elves not interfere with how they go about it or give aid to the Federation. In exchange, Ajin assures the king that the Skaar will not harm the Elves or their lands. The Elves agree to the alliance.

Drisker Arc finds himself trapped in limbo inside Paranor. He is visited by the shade of Cogline, who is also trapped inside Paranor as a sort of shadow of his former self. Cogline reveals that he transported the Black Elfstone into Drisker's pocket, taking it from Clizia Porse. Drisker discovers that he also has the scrye orb, but that Clizia Porse has taken the Stiehl Blade, a magical knife that can cut through anything. Cogline reveals that a price will be required of Drisker to allow him to use the Black Elfstone to restore Paranor to the land of the living but does not reveal what that price is. Drisker makes many unsuccessful attempts to use the Black Elfstone to restore Paranor.

Clizia Porse travels with a goods caravan, musing about how she destroyed the Druid Order to form a new Druid Order with herself as Ard Rhys, leader of the druids. She discovers that the Black Elfstone is missing, and she now has no way to return Paranor from limbo. She travels to Drisker's cottage to find the books of old magic he kept there to see if they have anything in them that could help her restore Paranor.

Tarsha Kaynin returns home only to find that it has been burned to the ground. The villagers chase her away, and tell her never to return, fearful that she will use her magic to harm them as well. Outside of town, an old woman tells Tarsha that the townspeople burned her parents house down after her brother Tavo left. She reveals that Tavo murdered their parents and many other people, tearing them apart with his evil form of Wishsong. She tells Tarsha which direction he traveled, and Tarsha heads off to find him. On her travels, she is attacked by three bandits. She uses the Wishsong to defend herself but is cut during the attack and the wound festers. She travels to Drisker's cottage where she finds Clizia Porse. Clizia heals her wounds. While Tarsha is asleep, Clizia Porse contacts Drisker Arc with the scrye orb. She tells him that if he returns Paranor to the real world that she will not harm Tarsha. Drisker Arc uses magic to contact Tarsha in spirit form. He warns her that Clizia Porse is the one that destroyed the druids and banished Paranor into limbo along with him inside. He tells her to find Dar Leah.

Dar travels to Arborlon and warns his friend Brecon Elessedil not to trust Ajin d'Amphere. He reveals that it was a druid, Clizia Porse, that betrayed the druids and sent Paranor into limbo. He convinces Brecon to "borrow" the blue seeking elfstones and help him find Tarsha Kaynin. They learn she is in Drisker Arc's cottage and head there. Tavo has also learned this and reaches the cottage first where he tries to kill Tarsha and almost succeeds. Clizia Porse intervenes and convinces him not to kill her until she can make use of her. In exchange she will teach him how to control his magic and become more powerful. He agrees, but in reality, she wants to use his powerful magic to kill Drisker Arc. Dar and Brecon reach the cottage where they meet the forest Imp, Flinc, and his moor cat, Fade. They rescue Tarsha and leave Clizia Porse and Tavo unconscious, but during the fight, Flinc disappears with Tarsha. Brecon uses the blue elfstones to track them down. Flinc takes Tarsha to his underground home in the forest, but Clizia Porse and Tavo quickly find them. Flinc sends Tarsha down a tunnel while he confronts the two. The faerie creature blows himself up, sending poison darts into his enemies. Clizia Porse uses a spell to heal herself and Tavo.

Ketter Vause discovers that the Skaar invasion force is camped on the north shore of the Mermidon River. He wonders about the Skaar's intentions, and how reliable Kol'Dre's assurances were. He orders two companies to the south shore of the river. The Skaar then forge a letter to the company commander from Ketter Vause ordering them to attack. They send their troop transport airships across the river, but they had been sabotaged by the Skaar before takeoff, and they crash to the ground, killing the troops aboard. Meanwhile, the Skaar army flanks and attacks the soldiers remaining in the Federation encampment, executing a decisive victory. Ajin then has the Federation commander executed. Ketter Vause learns of the attack and orders the Fifth Army and its airship fleet to the battlefront to wipe out the Skaar. Ajin flies to the Elven king and tells him the Skaar were attacked without provocation and pleads with him to send the Elven Army to fight the Federation with the Skaar, but he does not send their army. Ajin learns that Sten'Or has been spying for the Pretender. He tells her that her father is merely the Pretender's puppet at this point, and Ajin fears that the Skaar Army will not come to aid her advance force that is sure to be greatly outnumbered by the Federation's Fifth Army, but the Skaar Army arrives just in time.

A gambler in Varfleet named Rocan Arneas employs a young street orphan named Shea Ohmsford to help him out of a deadly situation with some other gamblers. Impressed with his skills, Rocan asks Shea if he would like to accompany him to Arishaig to help him with something, and Shea agrees. Rocan introduces Shea to his companion Seelah, a beautiful, catlike, shapeshifting faerie creature that can turn invisible. In Arishaig, they are confronted by Commander Zakonis and his soldiers, but Seelah attacks them, and they escape. They battle bandits as they make their way through the city to Rocan's other hideout, a warehouse that contains the weather-controlling machine called Annabelle. Rocan had been financing a scientist called Tindall to build it. However, Tindall was arrested and is being held in the Assidian Deep prison as bait by Commander Zakonis to capture Rocan. Rocan then asks Shea to help him break Tindall out of prison. After Rocan pays off some prison guards to look the other way, Shea enters the prison through the sewers, using an acid-like substance to melt through locks, and bars as he makes his way to Tindall's cell.

Clizia Porse contacts Drisker once more using the scrye orb, and he declines her deal, knowing that Tarsha has escaped, and warns Clizia Porse that he is coming for her. Clizia then begins to train Tavo, while keeping him sedated for her own safety. She convinces him that he must help her kill Drisker Arc, and then he can kill Tarsha with the Stiehl Blade. They then head to Paranor anticipating its restoration. Drisker Arc reaches out to Tarsha in spirit form again and tells her to come to Paranor as well. He is beginning to fade in limbo, but he finally realizes what the price is that he must pay to use the Black Elfstone to restore Paranor. He must agree to become Ard Rhys, the High Druid, and start a Fifth Druid Order. He agrees and restores Paranor. While Paranor is restored through the Black Elfstone, Drisker is infused with the memories and knowledge of all of the past Druids and Druid Histories. As the novel closes, Clizia Porse sees Paranor restored, and sends Tavo down to kill Drisker Arc when he exits the keep. However, when Tavo sees his sister, he cannot resist killing her first and stabs her in the back with the Stiehl Blade.

== Characters ==
The characters are:

- Ajin d’Amphere is a princess from the island nation of Skaarsland near the continent of Eurodia, and daughter of Cor d’Amphere.
- Annabelle is a machine that can allegedly change the weather. Tindall thinks she is alive.
- Belladrin Rish is personal assistant to Ketter Vause.
- Brecon Elessedil is an Elven prince, fourth son of King Gerrendren Elesedil.
- Clizia Porse is an evil Druid with plans to take over Paranor as Ard Rhys of a new Druid Order.
- Cogline is a shadow of the long dead Druid/Scientist trapped in Paranor.
- Darcon (Dar) Leah is the High Druid’s Blade, the commander of the guard at Paranor.
- Fade is giant moor cat.
- Flinc is a forest Imp, in love with Tarsha.
- Fluken is Tavo’s evil, imaginary friend.
- Gerrendren Elessedil is the king of the Elves.
- Ketter Vause is the Federation Prime Minister.
- Kol’Dre formerly known as Kassen, but now revealed to be The Penetrator of the Skaar, is the closest advisor to Ajin d’Amphere, whom he secretly loves, despite being lowborn.
- Paranor is the Druid Keep.
- Pre’Oltien is a fellow penetrator and friend to Kol’Dre.
- The Pretender is Ajin d’Amphere’s evil step-mother.
- Rocan Arneas is the financier of Annabelle.
- Seelah is a beautiful cat-like shapeshifter, that can be invisible.
- Sten’Or is senior commander in the Skaar army.
- Tarsha Kaynin is sister to Tavo, Wishsong wielder and student of Drisker Arc.
- Tavo Kaynin is a madman in possession of a lethal form of Wishsong.
- Tindall is the inventor of Annabelle, using Old World science.
- Zakonis is a federation commander.

== Reception ==
Publishers Weekly wrote that "Although Brooks's prose and characters remain unremarkable, he does a better job of juggling multiple story lines in this middle volume of his final Shannara epic fantasy trilogy than in its predecessor," and that the story remained accessible to readers unfamiliar with the rest of the series.

Aidan Moher of Reactor praised the book's handling of political themes like climate change and xenophobia, and considered it to be a "classic installment" in the series.

The book entered The New York Times Best Seller list in July 2018.
