= The Wishsong of Shannara =

1985 novel by Terry Brooks

- US first edition cover
- Author: Terry Brooks
- Cover artist: Darrell K. Sweet
- Language: English
- Series: The Original Shannara Trilogy
- Genre: Fantasy
- Publisher: Del Rey Books
- Publication date: April 12, 1985
- Publication place: United States
- Media type: Print (Hardcover, Paperback, Mass market paperback)
- Pages: 467
- ISBN: 0-345-31823-4 (hardcover)
- OCLC: 11316592
- Dewey Decimal: 813/.54 19
- LC Class: PS3552.R6596 W5 1985
- Preceded by: The Elfstones of Shannara
- Followed by: The Scions of Shannara

The Wishsong of Shannara is an epic fantasy novel by American writer Terry Brooks. It is the final novel in the Original Shannara Trilogy, with the other two being The Sword of Shannara and The Elfstones of Shannara. The story revolves around Jair and Brin Ohmsford, the children of the main characters from The Elfstones of Shannara: Wil Ohmsford and Eretria. The siblings, each possessing an inherited magic, must save the Four Lands from the evil magic within a tome called the Ildatch.

== Plot summary ==
=== Prelude ===
Before the dawn of mankind, Demons created a book of dark magic, called the Ildatch. This book was so full of their dark essence that it became a living thing, with a will of its own. When the Druids gathered all knowledge and lore of the Old World to themselves in the aftermath of the Great Wars, the book of Ildatch was uncovered after countless millennia. It remained harmless until the Druid Brona found it in the halls of Paranor and began to read and unlock its terrible secrets. Brona was eventually subverted by the very power he sought to control and thus the Warlock Lord was born. Allanon thought that the dark book had been buried in the destruction of the Skull Kingdom after Shea triumphed over the Warlock Lord in The Sword of Shannara, but it soon became apparent that the survivors of the calamity recovered the book, and delved into its arcane knowledge.

=== The Beginning ===
Allanon returned to the world due to the presence of a new evil, and once more he needed the aid of another generation of Ohmsfords. It is revealed that the Ildatch possessed a new generation of mortals, the Mord Wraiths, to pick up where the Warlock Lord left off. From their stronghold in the Eastland, the Mord Wraiths enslaved many Gnomes and sent them against the Dwarves. Allanon needed Brin's magic, the Wishsong, to enable him to enter the Maelmord, which is a living jungle that kills anyone who sets foot in it, and destroy the Ildatch. Helping her is Rone Leah, who is the great-grandson of Menion Leah. He wields the Sword of Leah, which is an "ordinary" sword until Allanon dips it into the waters of the Hadeshorn to help him to protect Brin. Jair was left at home, despite his pleas to go with his older sister, but he ran north when Gnomes begin searching Shady Vale itself. Allanon explains that Jair's command of the Wishsong only lies in illusion, where Brin's command of the Wishsong lies in reality.

=== Jair's Odyssey ===
Jair was left at home to watch over the Ohmsford house and to inform his parents of what had transpired during Allanon's visit. Not long after, however, he found himself in some trouble of his own when he stumbled across the gnome, Slanter, who was tracking the druid for the Mord Wraiths. After leaving Slanter unconscious and sneaking back into his house to retrieve the elfstones, hoping to defeat the Wraiths, he headed north to the Highlands. Slanter soon caught up with him, though. He was captured and was given over to the gnome patrol for whom Slanter was tracking. Later on when it seemed like there was no hope of escape and he was to be delivered to one of the Black Walkers, the gnome patrol stumbled on Garet Jax, a dark and mysterious warrior people knew as the Weapons Master. He freed Jair along with a little assistance from Slanter. The small company decided to head east to Culhaven, home of the dwarves, hoping to find word of Allanon and Brin's passing. Jair met the King of the Silver River here; the ancient faerie creature informed him that unless he went to the Eastland, Brin would die. He offered Jair his help. He gave Jair 3 magics (A one time real use of the Wishsong, a bag of Silver Dust to purify the Silver River, and a mirror that allowed Jair to view Brin through use of the Wishsong) for Jair's three Elfstones and then said to him that Garet Jax would protect him on his way to Brin. In exchange, he asked Jair to purify the Silver River at its source, as the Silver River was being poisoned by the Mord Wraiths. Jair went on his quest, joined by the Gnome Slanter and a group from Culhaven, including the "Weapons Master" Garet Jax.

=== The End of Ildatch ===
Meanwhile, Brin and Rone watched helplessly as Allanon was killed by an ancient Demon, a Jachyra, that had been summoned by the Mord Wraiths. The creature was destroyed, but Allanon, the last of the Druids, was mortally wounded and Rone is wounded when he attempts to aid Allanon with the Sword of Leah. The Jachyra throws the sword from the battle scene into a river. Before he died, Allanon marked Brin's line to succeed him. Rone and Brin pressed on, hopeless. They met Cogline, a partially insane old man who tamed a Moor Cat named Whisper, and his granddaughter, Kimber Boh, who was skilled in many techniques, and who helped them on their journey. First, Kimber Boh takes Rone and Brin to visit the Grimpond, an ancient being, much like the wraiths of Bremen and Allanon but much more maligned. The spirit informs Brin (who spoke to the being alone) that the quest will claim her life and those traveling with her. After the meeting with the Grimpond; Cogline, Kimber Boh, and Whisper aid Rone and Brin in retrieving the Sword of Leah from a tribe of Spider Gnomes. After another long trek, Brin left the others while they were in the sewers of the castle and finally reached the Ildatch. Brin found herself unable to destroy it because first, she became entranced, and then she was possessed by it. The tome coveted her power and wanted to use her body as a tool to wield its destruction. At the last moment, as he had just purified the Silver River, Jair uses the Wishsong (the given ability from the King of the Silver River) to appear in the chamber where Brin is being subverted by the Ildatch. He found Brin almost deformed by her power and was horrified by the skeletal appearance she had assumed. He tried to snap Brin out of her trance with his illusions but failed. Nevertheless, the love of her brother snapped Brin out of her trance. She finally destroyed the book, and the siblings returned home, but at a price: Allanon was dead, along with nearly all of Jair's companions (all but Slanter). At the end, the shade of Allanon came to Brin and told her never to use the wishsong again then reminded her of her trust, and informed her that magic would soon fade from the world again.

== "Indomitable" ==
"Indomitable" is a short story published in Robert Silverberg's Legends II, written by Brooks as an epilogue to The Wishsong of Shannara storyline.

After the end of The Wishsong of Shannara, Brin has now married Rone and Jair is still with his parents, working in their business when Kimber Boh found him. She told him that Cogline has asked that he travel to the Eastland to destroy the last page of the Ildatch. He does, and so he traveled to the ruins of the Maelmord where the last vestiges of the Mord Wraiths are using their power. Jair found out that his Wishsong became more powerful, allowing him not only to create illusions, but to actually change his physical form. Jair destroys the last page of the Ildatch, by assuming the form of Garet Jax and returns home.

== Dark Wraith of Shannara ==
Dark Wraith of Shannara is a graphic novel that was released on March 25, 2008. It is set a few years after The Wishsong of Shannara and "Indomitable". Its main characters are Jair and Brin Ohmsford, Kimber Boh, the Druid Cogline, and "the evil and dangerous" Croton Witch.

== Characters ==
The characters in the book are:

=== Main ===
- Allanon is a Druid who has been alive for around 400 years through the use of Druid Sleep. He goes with Brin Ohmsford to stop the Mord Wraiths and destroy the Ildatch.
- Brin Ohmsford, is the daughter of Wil Ohmsford and born with the magic of the wishsong.
- Cogline is an old man with magical powers who assists Brin Ohmsford and Rone Leah in the battle against the Mord Wraiths.
- Garet Jax is a renowned Weapons Master and skilled in every weapon known to man.
- Jair Ohmsford is the son of Wil Ohmsford and born with the magic of the wishsong.
- Kimber Boh is the adopted daughter of Cogline.
- Rone Leah the great-grandson of Menion Leah and a Prince of Leah.
- Slanter is a gnome.
- Whisper is a moor cat and is part of the company that goes to Ravenshorn.

=== Minor ===
- Browork, a dwarf. The First Elder of the Dwarf Council of Elders in the dwarf village of Culhaven.
- Edain Elessedil is a Prince of the Elves the son of Ander Elessedil. He is part of the company that goes to Ravenshorn.
- Eretria is the mother of Jair and Brin Ohmsford.
- Elb Foraker is a dwarf. He is part of the company that goes to Ravenshorn.
- Helt is a borderman and tracker. He is part of the company that goes to Ravenshorn.
- Grimpond is a shade that answers questions with riddles.
- Jeft is a woodsman.
- King of the Silver River is the oldest surviving living being in the Four Lands.
- Radhomm is a dwarf commander.
- Stebb is a trader.
- Spilk is a Gnome chieftain.
- Stythys is a Mwellret, a species of Troll that had taken on the look of reptiles.
- Wil Ohmsford is the father of Jair and Brin Ohmsford.

== Reception ==
Neil Gaiman reviewed The Wishsong of Shannara for Imagine magazine, and stated that "Terry Brooks rehashes the same Lord of the Rings ripoff he inflicted on the public in the first two books. A must for those who like fantasy trilogies with silly names."

== Reviews ==
- Review by Amelia Rutledge (1985) in Fantasy Review, August 1985
- Review by Nik Morton (1985) in Paperback Inferno, #57
- Review by Andy Sawyer (1986) in Paperback Inferno, #62
