= The Black Elfstone =

2017 novel by Terry Brooks

- Cover art of The Black Elfstone
- Author: Terry Brooks
- Cover artist: Mike Bryan
- Language: English
- Series: The Fall of Shannara
- Genre: Fantasy
- Publisher: Del Rey Books
- Publication date: June 13, 2017
- Publication place: United States
- Media type: Mass Market Paperback
- Pages: 464 pp
- ISBN: 978-0-553-39150-3
- Preceded by: The Sorcerer's Daughter
- Followed by: The Skaar Invasion

The Black Elfstone is a fantasy novel by Terry Brooks in his Shannara series. It is the first book in The Fall of Shannara series, first published in 2017.

== Plot ==
The novel begins with a stranger hiring a man called Tigueron to assassinate the druid Drisker Arc, former High Druid of Paranor. We are then introduced to Tavo Kaynin, who reminisces about growing up with his sister and discovering the Wishsong magic they have. Tarsha has control of hers. Tavo's is more chaotic, and he destroys things with it when he loses his temper. After being implicated in the disappearance of a neighborhood bully, Tavo is sent to live with his uncle and warned not to use his magic. Two years later, Tarsha visits Tavo against her parents’ will. Tavo is living in a shed like an animal, something her uncle defends because Tavo is dangerous. Tavo sends her away. Tarsha determines to seek training from the druids, then return to help Tavo.

Meanwhile, Tavo murders his uncle, parents, and several others, tearing them apart with an explosive, and deadly form of Wishsong. He then sets out to find his sister Tarsha and murder her for abandoning him. Along the way he stops in a tavern and is hassled by some of the patrons. He murders everyone in the tavern. Tavo continues on his journey, haunted by those he has killed and Fluken, an evil imaginary friend, or possibly a split personality that encourages Tavo to do his worst.

In the north, an Army of Trolls is defeated by a mysterious army of soldiers that are able to disappear, allowing them to easily defeating the mighty troll army. The Druid council learns of this and the High Druid, Ober Balronen, sends druids Zia and Ruis to investigate. He sends the Druid High Blade, Darcon (Dar) Leah along as well, and asks that he report Zia and Ruis’ doings back to him. As they travel north, Zia reveals that she is no longer with Ruis, and that she loved Dar. Dar wonders if he still has feelings for Zia. They see the mysterious army, and Ruis demands to investigate on the ground alone despite Dar's warnings. While on the ground they are attacked by the mysterious enemy and Ruis is executed. The survivors flee into the mountains aboard their airship. The enemy pursues them and destroys their airship. Everyone dies except Dar, who leaps from the ship to a cliff face and climbs down to safety. A mysterious white cloaked enemy sees him on the cliff face and can easily kill him, but after a tense standoff, lets Dar go.

Tarsha seeks out Drisker Arc near the town of Emberen, and after a display of her abilities, he agrees to train her. Her training is interrupted when Drisker is called away to help the Trolls. While he is away, assassins attack Drisker's cottage. Tarsha escapes with Drisker's two heavy volumes of spells and conjurings. A forest imp called Flinc helps her escape. When Drisker returns to find his cottage burned, Flinc tells him that Tarsha was killed. He quickly recants, and Drisker finds her drugged in the imp's home. Flinc had wanted to keep her. The assassins attack again, and Drisker kills several of them. He recognizes them as Orsis Guild and decides to seek them out. In the city of Varfleet a street orphan called Shea Ohmsford leads Drisker and Tarsha to the Orsis Guild where they find Tigueron. Tigueron describes the person that hired them to assassinate him and then Drisker breaks his neck.

A young man called Kassen Drue applies to train with the druids. He demonstrates an ability to disappear, and project an illusion of himself. He seduces a young Druid-in-Training called Allis, and she shows him the secret entrance into Paranor.

Dar returns to Paranor, reports what happened and suggests asking the Elves for help. Balronen is incensed and not only ignores that idea but banishes and exiles Dar from Paranor for his failure. On his way out he sees Allis and Kassen. A druid called Clizia Porse gives him his Sword of Leah and urges that he leave before it's too late and seek Drisker Arc.

Drisker and Tarsha go to Paranor, but the High Druid refuses to speak with them. Clizia Porse brings him up to speed on what has transpired, and gives him a scrye orb, with which Drisker can contact her. Drisker describes the man who hired his assassin, but she claims not to know of whom he speaks. Drisker and Tarsha then return to Emberen. Dar meets them at Driskers cottage. Drisker describes the man who hired his assassin to Dar and Dar tells him it sounds like Kassen Drue, a man with the power to disappear like the soldiers of the mysterious army in the north, who was recently admitted as a Druid-in-Training by Clizia Porse. Alarmed by this revelation, Drisker and Dar head back to Paranor. Tarsha strikes off on her own to find her brother. At a tavern, she is joined by a mysterious seer called Parlindru who predicts that three times she will love, three times she will die, and three times she will make a difference.

Back at Paranor Kassen murders Allis. Drisker asks Clizia Porse why she lied about knowing Kassen, but then Paranor is invaded by disappearing soldiers. Clizia convinces Drisker to help her retrieve the Black Elfstone and send Paranor into limbo. He doesn't trust her but agrees to this to protect Paranor. Dar leaves Drisker to fight the invaders that are inside Paranor slaughtering the druids. He attacks Kassen, but he disappears and escapes. Drisker retrieves the Black Elfstone, and then Clizia Porse scratches him with a poison that leaves him paralyzed. Drisker releases the Guardian from the Druid's Well which begins slaughtering the invaders with a deadly green mist. Clizia Porse and Dar escape from Paranor, and Clizia uses the Black Elfstone to send Paranor into limbo disappearing it from the Four Lands, then leaves Dar behind. Dar finds the leader of the invasion who turns out to be a young woman. The novel closes as Drisker realizes the Guardian has spared him but that he is trapped in limbo inside Paranor.

== Characters ==
The characters are:

- Allis Errencarthyjorian is a young Druid-in-Training.
- Chu Frenk is a dwarf druid, and sycophantic member of the High Druid's council.
- Clizia Porse is a druid of Paranor.
- Crace Adris is a druid historian.
- Darcon (Dar) Leah is the High Druid's Blade, the commander of the guard at Paranor.
- Fade is giant moor cat.
- Flinc is a forest Imp, in love with Tarsha.
- Fluken is Tavo's evil, imaginary friend, possibly his split personality.
- Kassen Drue is a new Druid-in-Training.
- Ober Balronen is the Ard Rhys, High Druid of Paranor.
- Paranor is the Druid Keep.
- Parfend is the leader, or Maturen of the Corrax Trolls.
- Parlindru is a mysterious seer.
- Prax Tolt is a leader of warrior druids.
- Ruis Quince is a druid of Paranor, and Zia's lover.
- Tarsha Kaynin is sister to Tavo, Wishsong wielder and student of Drisker Arc.
- Tavo Kaynin is a madman in possession of a lethal form of Wishsong.
- Tigueron is the leader of the Orsis Guild, a band of assassins.
- Zia Amarodian is a half-Elf druid; former friend and lover to Dar Leah.

== Reception ==
Publishers Weekly wrote that "the first volume of Brooks's quartet, which will bring this decades-old Shannara epic fantasy saga to a close, works best for readers at opposite poles: series devotees” familiar with the backstory, “and newcomers” alike.

Aidan Moher of Reactor writes that although Brooks has planned The Fall of Shannara to be the conclusion to the Shannara series, he may "write more Shannara novels, just not ones that move the story forward chronologically." Moher praises The Black Elfstone as "a vintage Shannara novel" that "proves that 40 years later, [Brook’s has] still got it. It has epic scope, heroic characters, and so much heart."
