= The Scions of Shannara =

Novel by Terry Brooks

- First edition
- Author: Terry Brooks
- Cover artist: Keith Parkinson
- Language: English
- Series: Heritage of Shannara
- Genre: Fantasy
- Publisher: Del Rey Books
- Publication date: March 1990
- Publication place: United States
- Media type: Print (paperback)
- Pages: 419 pp
- ISBN: 0-345-37074-0
- OCLC: 23250182
- Preceded by: The Wishsong of Shannara
- Followed by: The Druid of Shannara

The Scions of Shannara, first published in 1990, is a fantasy novel by American writer Terry Brooks. It is the first book in the Heritage of Shannara series, taking place three hundred years after the end of the previous Shannara trilogy. The book follows the lives of the Scions of Shannara, Par Ohmsford, Walker Boh, and Wren (Ohmsford).

== Plot summary ==
Par Ohmsford and his brother Coll start the story in Varfleet, telling legends of the past in a tavern through the use of Par's magic, the wishsong. At this point, Par can only use his magic to create illusions. What Par and Coll are doing, however, is illegal under the law of the Federation because magic is supposedly the cause for various problems that are occurring in the Four Lands. Rimmer Dall, first seeker for the Federation, bursts in and tries to arrest Par and Coll. They escape and decide to travel to Leah to meet up with their friend, Morgan Leah.

A former Druid named Cogline visits all the "scions of Shannara": Par Ohmsford, Walker Boh, and Par's cousin, Wren. All the scions meet at the Valley of Shale and receive tasks from the shade of Allanon. Wren is charged to return the missing elves, Walker is charged with returning Paranor and the Druids, and Par is charged with finding the lost Sword of Shannara. Both Wren and Walker see their charges as impossible and leave, but Par is determined to fulfill his task.

Par heads to the city of Varfleet with his companions, Morgan Leah, Coll Ohmsford, Steff, and Teel to request for help from an outlaw ally. Upon reaching their meeting point, however, they are pursued by Federation. Hirehone, one of the outlaws, hides them in an underground basement before taking them to the Parma Key.

The party then enlists the help of the outlaw chief, Padishar Creel. Leaving the Dwarves behind, Creel, Morgan, Coll, a group of outlaws, and Par set out for Tyrsis, the last known place of the Sword of Shannara. Once in Tyrsis, Creel leads them to a hiding place. Par and Creel go out to show Par about the truth. They meet with a girl, Damson Rhee. They go for a walk and Creel explains that the Bridge of Sendric and People's Park were fake and the real ones had been covered up. They devise a plan so that Morgan, Par, Coll, Padishar, and some of the other outlaws venture into the pit, where the Sword of Shannara was last seen.

That at night, the group venture out to the pit. They lower a ladder into The Pit, unfortunately the Federation guards managed to see them. They were captured and told that someone had betrayed them. On the way to prison, Par uses the Wishsong to distract the guards so he could escape.

== Characters ==
- Par Ohmsford
- Coll Ohmsford
- Walker Boh
- Wren Elessedil
- Garth
- Cogline
- Steff
- Teel
- Padishar Creel
- Damson Rhee
- Rimmer Dall
- Morgan Leah

== Popular culture ==
In the film The Big Short (2015), Michael Burry names his hedge fund company, Scion Capital, after The Scions of Shannara. The film also shows Burry (played by Christian Bale) reading the book.
