= Sometimes the Magic Works =

2003 book by Terry Brooks

Sometimes the Magic Works: Lessons from a Writing Life
- Author: Terry Brooks
- Subject: Memoir, writing guide
- Published: 2003
- Publication place: United States
- Pages: 197
- ISBN: 9780345458285
- OCLC: 50132277

Sometimes the Magic Works: Lessons from a Writing Life is a book by Terry Brooks. First published in 2003, it seeks to give advice to aspiring writers, often telling some of the stories behind Brooks' own literature as an example.
