= Legends II (anthology) =

Short story anthology

- First edition (UK)
- Editor: Robert Silverberg
- Author: Various
- Language: English
- Genre: Fantasy
- Published: December 30, 2003
- Publisher: Del Rey Books
- Publication place: United States
- Media type: Print (hardcover & paperback)
- Pages: 379
- ISBN: 0-345-45644-0
- OCLC: 42695477
- Preceded by: Legends

Legends II: New Short Novels by the Masters of Modern Fantasy is a 2003 collection of 11 short stories by a number of fantasy authors, edited by Robert Silverberg. All the stories were original to the collection, and set in the authors' established fictional worlds. The first Legends was published in 1998.

In 2004, the Legends II anthology was republished as two volumes, Legends II: Dragon, Sword, and King and Legends II: Shadows, Gods, and Demons.

== Contents ==
Author	Short story title	World	Republished in
Robin Hobb	"Homecoming"	The Realm of the Elderlings	Legends II: Shadow, Gods, and Demons
George R. R. Martin	The Sworn Sword (novella)	A Song of Ice and Fire	Legends II: Dragon, Sword, and King
Orson Scott Card	"The Yazoo Queen"	The Tales of Alvin Maker	Legends II: Dragon, Sword, and King
Diana Gabaldon	Lord John and the Succubus (novella)	Outlander	Legends II: Dragon, Sword, and King
Robert Silverberg	"The Book of Changes"	Majipoor	Legends II: Shadow, Gods, and Demons
Tad Williams	"The Happiest Dead Boy in the World"	Otherland	Legends II: Shadow, Gods, and Demons
Anne McCaffrey	"Beyond Between"	Dragonriders of Pern	Legends II: Shadow, Gods, and Demons
Raymond E. Feist	"The Messenger"	The Riftwar Saga	Legends II: Shadow, Gods, and Demons
Elizabeth Haydon	"Threshold"	Symphony of Ages	Legends II: Dragon, Sword, and King
Neil Gaiman	"The Monarch of the Glen"	American Gods	Legends II: Shadow, Gods, and Demons
Terry Brooks	"Indomitable"	Shannara	Legends II: Dragon, Sword, and King

== Editions ==
- A hardback edition was published by Voyager on September 1, 2003 in the United Kingdom (ISBN 0-00-715434-8).
- Another hardback edition was published by Random House in January 2004 in the United States and Canada (ISBN 0-345-45644-0).
- A paperback edition was published by Voyager on February 2, 2004 in the United Kingdom (ISBN 0-00-715435-6).
- An eBook edition was published by Random House as a Del Rey edition on December 30, 2003 in the United States and Canada (ISBN 978-0-345-47109-3).
- An audio book edition was published in three volumes by Random House as a Del Rey edition in the United States and Canada.
  - Volume 1 (December 30, 2003, ISBN 978-0-7393-1083-0)
  - Volume 2 (July 13, 2004, ISBN 978-0-7393-1085-4)
  - Volume 3 (November 9, 2004, ISBN 978-0-7393-1087-8)
- A paperback edition was published by Random House as a Del Rey edition in the United States and Canada in two volumes.
  - Volume 1 (October 26, 2004, ISBN 978-0-345-47577-0)
  - Volume 2 (October 26, 2004, ISBN 978-0-345-47578-7)

== See also ==
- Legends
