= The Measure of the Magic =

2011 novel by Terry Brooks

- First edition (publ. Del Rey Books)
- Author: Terry Brooks
- Language: English
- Series: Legends of Shannara
- Genre: fantasy
- Publisher: Del Rey
- Publication date: 2011-08-23
- ISBN: 9781841495873
- LC Class: PS3552.R6596
- Preceded by: Bearers of the Black Staff
- Followed by: First King of Shannara

The Measure of the Magic is a fantasy novel by American writer Terry Brooks, released on August 23, 2011, as the second of the two part Legends of Shannara series. Set after Bearers of the Black Staff and before First King of Shannara, the novel chronicles the adventures of Panterra Qu, a Tracker entrusted with the Black Staff after the death of Sider Ament during Bearers of the Black Staff.
