= First King of Shannara =

1996 novel by Terry Brooks

- First edition
- Author: Terry Brooks
- Cover artist: Kevin Parkinson
- Language: English
- Series: Prequel to The Original Shannara Trilogy
- Genre: Epic fantasy
- Publisher: Del Rey Books
- Publication date: 19 March 1996
- Publication place: United States
- Media type: Print (hardback & paperback)
- Pages: 489 (hardcover); 448 (paperback)
- ISBN: 0-345-39652-9
- OCLC: 33897746
- Dewey Decimal: 813/.54 20
- LC Class: PS3552.R6596 F57 1996
- Preceded by: The Measure of the Magic
- Followed by: The Sword of Shannara

First King of Shannara is a 1996 epic fantasy novel by American writer Terry Brooks.

== Plot summary ==
Horrified by the consequences of the First War of the Races, most of the Druids at Paranor stopped studying the arcane arts and turned to the sciences of the Old World.

Brona, now known as the Warlock Lord, had been behind the First War of the Races, and was thought to have died during it. But he had secretly survived, and now has come to make a new war upon the Races. He is now stronger than ever, gathering spirits from the netherworld and a massive Troll and Gnome army under his banner. Brona's first target is Paranor, the home of the Druids who defeated him during the First War of the Races. He easily wipes out the Druid order.

The only survivors are the followers of Bremen, an outcast Druid who continued to study the mystic arts and tried to warn the council before it was too late. Bremen had been cast from the Druid Council because he had an interest in magic, now forbidden since the disaster that turned the Druid Brona into the Warlock Lord. As a result, the council didn't trust him. Along with Tay Trefenwyd and Risca, who are the only Druids who believe Bremen and leave with him, Bremen leaves Paranor.

Later, the three are joined by Mareth, an apprentice Druid with innate magic, as well as empathic powers. After reaching the Hadeshorn and summoning the shade of Galaphile, Bremen is given four visions. Bremen learns that the Warlock Lord seeks the Black Elfstone, which would grant him tremendous power. Bremen sends Tay Trefenwyd to recover the Black Elfstone before the Warlock Lord can, and sends Risca to warn and aid the Dwarves from the army of the Warlock Lord.

Tay Trefenwyd, along with his best friend Jerle Shannara go to the king to seek his aid. However, the entire royal family is destroyed by the Warlock Lord's minions, all but for two young grandchildren. Tay starts to go and search for the Black Elfstone, believing that action is better than inaction, taking with him Jerle Shannara, as well as a small party of Elven Hunters, and Preia Starle, who loves Jerle Shannara, but whom Tay Trefenwyd loves. However, Tay never even speaks of his love for her, as his loyalty to Jerle is so strong.

Tay eventually comes upon where the Black Elfstone is hidden, with an ancient race called the Chew Magna, who have been subverted by the magic of the Black Elfstone. Cloaking himself in magic that makes him one of them, Tay manages to recover the Black Elfstone. However, upon leaving the Chew Magna, they are discovered by the Warlock Lord's minions, and Tay has no magic left, having spent it all recovering the elfstone.

Although he had been warned by Bremen on what would happen if the Black Elfstone is used, he uses it so that his friends can escape with the Black Elfstone. He destroys all the enemies, but is forced to sacrifice himself, drawing the air from his lungs rather than be subverted by the Black Elfstone. Meanwhile, Bremen, Kinson Ravenlock, and Mareth travel back to Paranor, fearing that the Druids are all already dead. On reaching Paranor, every Druid who remained is dead, and Bremen manages to recover the Eilt Druin, which he saw as pivotal in the creation of a weapon that can defeat the Warlock Lord.

Bremen knows that only truth can fight magic, so he devises a plan to create a magical weapon to destroy the Warlock Lord: the Sword of Shannara. Bremen learns how to make a metal stronger than iron from Cogline, and manages to create the sword by the mixing of science and magic. Upon finding a smith skilled enough to create the sword, the reader discovers that the smith is the ancestor of Panamon Creel. Bremen also discovers his successor as a Druid, the boy who is revealed to be Allanon, and possesses incredibly penetrating eyes, an immense intelligence, and a talent for magic.

The Sword is created by truth of existence, the only thing remaining to the shades of former Druids. The Warlock Lord could never face the truth that he had died centuries before, and the Sword would force that truth on him. Armed with truth, Bremen leads the battle in the Westland. He equips Jerle Shannara, the Elven King, with the Sword. After several battles, the Elves drive the Warlock Lord's armies from the Westland, and right into a trap set by the remains of the Dwarf army. During the final battle, Jerle confronts the Warlock Lord, and manages to defeat him but he fails to destroy him. To properly wield the talisman of truth, one must first be prepared to face the truth of his own life. Jerle simply could not reconcile the guilt he felt at his best friend's death, and so he lacked the ability to force truth on Brona. In this final battle, Risca is also killed.

Kinson Ravenlock and Mareth are married (with Mareth forsaking the Druid ways), as are Jerle Shannara and Preia Starle. Meanwhile, Bremen spends three years teaching Allanon what he needs to know in order to be a Druid. Afterwards, Bremen, in old age, succumbs to death, walking into the Hadeshorn, to be carried to the afterlife by the shade of Galaphile. Before he goes, he reveals to Allanon that the Warlock Lord was not destroyed, but simply forced into hiding, and that the task of destroying him will be given to Allanon.

== Reception ==
Publishers Weekly gave a mostly negative review, citing a lack of "depth of characterization", invention, and "magical moments of heart-stopping revelation" typical of most modern high fantasy novels.

Kirkus criticized its length and said it would only be of interest to Brooks's core audience.
