= Analogue (literature) =

Work or motif therein resembling another work

The term analogue is used in literary history in two related senses:

- a work which resembles another in terms of one or more motifs, characters, scenes, phrases or events.
- an individual motif, character, scene, event or phrase which resembles one found in another work.

Similarities may be fortuitous, in which case the merit of establishing an analogue is that it makes it possible to see how works from different authors (perhaps also in different languages, periods, genres) treat similar characters or motifs. But the term is used particularly in the study of legends, folk tales and oral literature for works that have features in common either because they derive from a shared tradition or because they both rework material from a specific older text, which may or may not still survive.

For example, some claim the story of Noah and the Flood in the Bible and the Epic of Gilgamesh are analogues.

However, where one work draws directly on another, the term analogue is inappropriate: the earlier work is the source of the latter.

In the literature of earlier periods, it may not be easy to decide whether a particular work is a direct source for another, especially if there are uncertainties of dating. The phrase sources and analogues is used to cover all material relevant to the creation of a particular work.
