= The Sword of Shannara =

1977 novel by Terry Brooks

- First hardcover edition (Random House)
- Author: Terry Brooks
- Illustrator: The Brothers Hildebrandt
- Cover artist: The Brothers Hildebrandt
- Language: English
- Series: Original Shannara Trilogy
- Genre: Epic fantasy
- Publisher: Ballantine/Del Rey
- Publication date: 1977
- Publication place: United States
- Media type: Print (Hardcover and Paperback)
- Pages: 726 pp
- ISBN: 0-345-24804-X (First edition)
- Preceded by: First King of Shannara
- Followed by: The Elfstones of Shannara

The Sword of Shannara is a 1977 epic fantasy novel by American writer Terry Brooks. It is the first book in a titular trilogy.

The novel interweaves two major plots into a fictional world called The Four Lands. One follows the protagonist Shea Ohmsford on his quest to gain the Sword of Shannara and use it to confront the Warlock Lord (the antagonist). The other plot shadows Prince Balinor Buckhannah's attempt to oust his insane brother Palance from the throne of Callahorn while the country and its capital (Tyrsis) come under attack from overwhelming armies of the Warlock Lord. The novel contains themes of mundane heroism and nuclear holocaust throughout.

Brooks wrote The Sword of Shannara over seven years, during which time he also attended law school. Ballantine Books published the novel and used it to launch the company's new subsidiary, Del Rey Books. The success of The Sword of Shannara significantly boosted the commercial prospects of the fantasy literary genre. Critics derided the novel for being derivative of J. R. R. Tolkien's The Lord of the Rings. Some accused Brooks of lifting the entire plot and many of his characters directly from Tolkien's work; others praised its execution despite the lack of originality.

== Plot ==
=== Background ===
Two thousand years before the events of the plot, a nuclear holocaust known as the "Great Wars" ended mankind's hegemony on Earth. These wars rearranged the planet's geography and wiped out 90% of the human population. Only traces of technological artifacts have been found; most advanced technology has been lost, but magic has been rediscovered. During this time, Mankind mutated into several distinct races: humans, dwarves, gnomes and trolls, all named after creatures from "age-old" myths. Also, elves begin to emerge after having been in seclusion and hiding for centuries. Man retreats southward while the other races settle elsewhere: the dwarves in the east, the gnomes in the hills of the northeast, the trolls in the north and the elves in the west. Due to this distribution, the territories, which roughly correspond to the Northwestern United States, are called the Four Lands.

A thousand years later, an Elf named Galaphile gathers all of the people who still hold some knowledge of the old world to the citadel of Paranor. Naming themselves the First Druid Council, they try to bring peace and order to all of the races. The rogue Druid Brona departs with his followers and the Ildatch, a magical tome that controls their minds. Hundreds of years later, Brona convinces all Men to attack the other races, triggering the First War of the Races. Although nearly victorious, he is ultimately defeated by the council and disappears. The Druids divide the Four Lands among the races and become reclusive, withdrawing to Paranor because of their shame at the betrayal by one of their own members.

Several centuries after the First War of the Races, Brona returns as the Warlock Lord, now with Skull Bearers as his servants. Chronicled in the prequel novel First King of Shannara, the Second War of the Races begins with the destruction of the Druid Order. A lone Druid, Bremen, forges a magical talisman to destroy the Warlock Lord; it is given to the Elven King, Jerle Shannara. As it takes the form of a blade, the talisman is named the Sword of Shannara. It succeeds in banishing the Warlock Lord. He is not killed, but his army is defeated by the combined armies of the Elves and Dwarves. Peace comes at a high price: interracial tension is renewed and the Druids have vanished.

=== Story ===
Five centuries later, Allanon, the last remaining Druid, arrives at the Ohmsford family inn in the Southland town of Shady Vale. He warns Shea, a half-elf adopted by the Ohmsfords, that the Warlock King has returned to the Skull Kingdom in the Northland and is coming for Shea. As the last descendant of Jerle Shannara, Shea is the only one who can wield the Sword of Shannara against the Warlock Lord. Allanon departs, leaving Shea three Blue Elfstones for protection. A few weeks later, the Callahorn prince Balinor Buckhannah arrives and tells Shea that the Warlock Lord's servants are pursuing him. Shea and his adopted brother Flick flee with a Skull Bearer on their trail. They take refuge in the nearby city of Leah where they find Shea's friend Menion, the son of the city's lord. Menion decides to accompany the two, and they travel to Culhaven to meet with Allanon and Balinor.

The council at Culhaven, which also includes the elven brothers Durin and Dayel Elessedil and the dwarf Hendel, assesses the Warlock King's current threat and decide to recover the Sword of Shannara from Paranor. During the party's trek to Paranor, they are beset by earthquakes, causing the path to crumble and sending the panicked Shea plummeting over a waterfall. His companions reach Paranor without him and engage in battle with minions of the Warlock Lord, only to find that the Sword of Shannara has already been removed. Learning of the Warlock Lord's invasion of the Southland, the party decides to split up, with some going to mobilize armies and others conducting a search for Shea.

After being captured by gnomes, Shea is rescued by the one-handed thief Panamon Creel and his mute Troll companion Keltset Mallicos. Journeying to the Northland, they reach the Skull Kingdom and pursue the insane Gnome deserter Orl Fane, who has carried the Sword of Shannara. Meanwhile, a disguised Flick infiltrates an enemy camp and rescues the captive Elven King, Eventine Elessedil; at the same time, in Kern, Menion saves a woman named Shirl Ravenlock and falls in love with her. They organize an evacuation of Kern before the Northland army reaches the city.

Balinor returns to Tyrsis to activate the Border Legion only to find that it has been disbanded. Balinor is then imprisoned by his brother Palance Buckhannah, who has taken control of Callahorn's rule. His advisor, Stenmin, has driven Palance mad with poisoned food, making him his pawn. With help from Menion, Balinor escapes and confronts Palance and Stenmin. Cornered, Stenmin kills Palance as a distraction and flees. Now commanded by Balinor, Callahorn's reformed Border Legion marches out of Tyrsis and engages the Northland army at the Mermiddon River, killing many Northlanders before being forced to pull back; the Border Legion retreats to Tyrsis and makes preparations for defense.

During the siege of Tyrsis, Hendel and Menion come upon Stenmin and some of his supporters in an underground passage. Hendel is killed, but Menion kills Stenmin and closes the passage. After three days, the Border Legion is beaten back from the Outer Wall of Tyrsis as a result of treachery—the wall falls when the traitors destroy the locks on the main gate, jamming it open. At the defenders' last stand on the Bridge of Sendic, the Northlanders abruptly break and run.

Infiltrating the Warlock Lord's fortress in the Skull Mountain, Shea seizes the sword and learns of its true power: those touched by it are confronted with the truth about their lives. The Warlock Lord materializes and tries to destroy Shea. Although immune to physical weapons, the Warlock Lord is subjected to the sword's power and forced to confront the truth about himself: he had deluded himself into believing that he is immortal, but this is impossible. Faced with this paradox, the Warlock Lord is destroyed.

Without its master, the Skull Kingdom crumbles, during which Keltset sacrifices himself to save his companions. In the south, the Northland army retreats after the Warlock Lord's downfall. Allanon saves Shea's life and reveals himself as Bremen's centuries-old son. Shea reunites with his companions in Tyrsis as peace returns to the Four Lands. Balinor takes up his country's rule, while Dayel and Durin return to the Westland, and Menion returns to Leah with Shirl. Shea and Flick reunite and return to Shady Vale.

== Characters ==
Depiction of the quest party by The Brothers Hildebrandt. Left to right: Menion, Dayel and Durin, Hendel (foreground), Balinor (background), Allanon (background), Shea, Flick.

=== Main characters ===
- Shea Ohmsford, the protagonist, Flick's adopted brother and the only remaining descendant of Jerle Shannara. Shea must find an ancient magical sword, the Sword of Shannara, and use it to destroy the antagonist, the Warlock Lord. A major theme of this novel revolves around Shea—part of his quest includes finding a belief in himself. This is a search that every subsequent Brooks protagonist must undergo.
- Flick Ohmsford, Shea's adopted brother.
- Menion Leah, a friend of Shea and the Prince of the small country of Leah.
- Balinor Buckhannah, the Crown Prince of the country of Callahorn and the charismatic commander of the Border Legion.
- Allanon, the last Druid of Paranor. Allanon has been described as a parallel to Merlin from Arthurian legend.
- Hendel, a taciturn Dwarf warrior.
- Durin and Dayel Elessedil, a pair of elven brothers who are cousins to King Eventine. The elder brother Durin is calm and inspires confidence, and the younger brother Dayel is gentle and shy.

=== Supporting characters ===
- Panamon Creel, a one-handed "con-man" wanderer whose left hand is now an iron pike. The inspiration for his character came directly from Rupert of Hentzau from The Prisoner of Zenda, by Anthony Hope.
- Keltset Mallicos, Panamon's mute troll companion.
- Palance Buckhannah, the brother of Balinor Buckhannah and a prince of Callahorn.
- Shirl Ravenlock, the daughter of an elder on the governing council of Kern, and a descendant of royal blood. She is one of only two women to appear directly in the book, with the other being the Siren.
- Shade of Bremen, the deceased father of Allanon. He resides in a lake called the Hadeshorn, just outside of the Hall of Kings.
- Eventine Elessedil, the king of the elves. He was captured by the gnome and troll army of Brona.
- Stenmin, a traitor to Callahorn now working for the Warlock Lord.
- Brona (the Warlock Lord), the former Druid and antagonist of the novel. In days long ago, Brona was a Druid before he was subverted by dark magic.
- Skull Bearers, "winged black destroyers" who sacrificed their humanity to become the Warlock Lord's most trusted servants.
- Orl Fane, a "Gollum-like" Gnome who "covets the Sword as Gollum does the ring."

== Development ==
Brooks began writing The Sword of Shannara in 1967 when he was twenty-three years old. He started writing the novel to challenge himself and as a way of staying "sane" while he attended law school at Washington and Lee University. Brooks had been a writer since high school, but he had never found 'his' genre: "I tried my hand at science fiction, westerns, war stories, you name it. All those efforts ... weren't very good." When he was starting college, he was given a copy of Tolkien's The Lord of the Rings to read for the first time. From then on, Brooks knew that he had found a genre he could write in. Writing Sword took seven years, as Brooks worked on it only sporadically while also completing his law school courses and rewrote it many times.

Brooks initially submitted his manuscript to DAW Books, whose editor Donald A. Wollheim rejected it and recommended submission to Judy-Lynn del Rey at Ballantine Books instead. Ballantine Books accepted The Sword of Shannara in November 1974. Brooks' editor was Lester del Rey, who used the book to launch Ballantine's new Del Rey Books imprint/subsidiary. Del Rey chose it because he felt that it was "the first long epic fantasy adventure which had any chance of meeting the demands of Tolkien readers for similar pleasures."

In 1977, The Sword of Shannara was simultaneously released as a trade paperback by Ballantine Books and hardback by Random House. The Brothers Hildebrandt, who had previously done illustration work for the work of Tolkien, were asked to make the cover. Greg Hildebrandt remembers the Del Reys as being "obsessed with the project. It was their baby." The novel was a commercial success, becoming the first fantasy fiction novel to appear on The New York Times trade paperback bestseller list.

The original inspiration for The Sword of Shannara was Brooks' desire to put "Tolkien's magic and fairy creatures [into] the worlds of Walter Scott and [Alexander] Dumas". Brooks was inspired by J. R. R. Tolkien's The Lord of the Rings and adventure fiction such as Alexandre Dumas' The Three Musketeers, Robert Louis Stevenson's Treasure Island, Arthur Conan Doyle's The White Company and Walter Scott's Ivanhoe.

Brooks decided not to use historical settings like these works. He instead followed Tolkien's use of a fantasy setting:

I would set my adventure story in an imaginary world, a vast, sprawling, mythical world like that of Tolkien, filled with magic that had replaced science and races that had evolved from Man. But I was not Tolkien and did not share his background in academia or his interest in cultural study. So I would eliminate the poetry and songs, the digressions on the ways and habits of types of characters, and the appendices of language and backstory that characterized and informed Tolkien's work. I would write the sort of straightforward adventure story that barreled ahead, picking up speed as it went, compelling a turning of pages until there were no more pages to be turned.

He admits that he was very influenced by The Lord of the Rings when writing it, being his first novel. However, Brooks has said that he has since evolved his own style :

Tolkien approached it as an academic, and he was writing it as an academic effort, not as popular fiction. I’m a popular fiction writer, that's the way I approached it. And I think that you're right, too, about the fact that I was heavily under the influence of Tolkien when I wrote Sword of Shannara and it shows in that particular book. But I've really gotten a long way away from Tolkien these days and not very many people come up to me any more and say, "Well, gee, you're writing an awful lot like Tolkien." They don't say that any more.

Brooks also made decisions about his novel's characterization and use of magic, saying that the magic "couldn't be dependable or simply good or bad". Also, he wanted to blur the distinctions between good and evil, "because life simply [doesn't] work that way." He wanted to ensure that readers would identify with his protagonist, Shea, which he accomplished by casting Shea as "a person simply trying to muddle through".

== Major themes ==
"Ordinary men placed in extraordinary circumstances" is a prevalent theme in The Sword of Shannara. Brooks credits Tolkien with introducing this theme of mundane heroism into fantasy literature and influencing his own fiction. "[M]y protagonists are cut from the same bolt of cloth as Bilbo and Frodo Baggins. It was Tolkien's genius to reinvent the traditional epic fantasy by making the central character neither God nor hero, but a simple man in search of a way to do the right thing. ... I was impressed enough by how it had changed the face of epic fantasy that I never gave a second thought to not using it as the cornerstone of my own writing."

The Sword of Shannara is set in a post-apocalyptic Earth, where chemical and nuclear holocaust devastated the land in the distant past. Due to the numerous references in Sword to this catastrophe, Brooks was asked a question about whether he thought that his 'prediction' might come true. He answered:

I don't see myself as a negative person, so I don't think I've ever thought we would destroy ourselves. But it does worry me that not only are we capable of [nuclear war], but [we also] flirt with the idea periodically. One mistake, after all . . . Anyway, I used the background in [The] Sword of Shannara more in a cautionary vein than as a prophecy. Also, it was necessary to destroy civilization in order to take a look at what it would mean to have to build it back up again using magic. A civilization once destroyed by misuse of power is a bit wary the second time out about what new power can do.

Environment plays a role in all of the Shannara novels: "Environment is a character in my story and almost always plays a major role in affecting the story's outcome. I have always believed that fantasy, in particular, because it takes place in an imaginary world with at least some imaginary characters, needs to make the reader feel at home in the setting. That means bringing the setting alive for the reader, which is what creating environment as a character is really all about." However, Brooks believes that Sword was more about behavioral issues and personal sacrifice.

== Literary significance and reception ==
The Sword of Shannara received mixed reviews following its publication, most of which remarked on its similarity to J. R. R. Tolkien's The Lord of the Rings. Choice stated that the novel was "exceptionally well-written, very readable" and "will be accepted by most teenagers." Marshall F. Tymn also thought that it contained quality prose. Tymn believed that Sword followed Lord of the Rings too closely, but he also cited some of the differences, such as the use of a post-holocaust setting with the races which sprang from it, and an "unexpected ending springing from the nature of the sword." Cathi Dunn MacRae felt that his strength was "his plot's momentum, maintained through cliffhangers" and "unexpected twists of fortune".

=== Similarities with The Lord of the Rings ===
The Sword of Shannara has drawn extensive criticism from critics who believe that Brooks derived too much of his novel from Tolkien's The Lord of the Rings. In 1978, American fantasy editor Lin Carter denounced The Sword of Shannara as "the single most cold-blooded, complete rip-off of another book that I have ever read". He further wrote that "Terry Brooks wasn't trying to imitate Tolkien's prose, just steal his story line and complete cast of characters, and he did it with such clumsiness and so heavy-handedly, that he virtually rubbed your nose in it." Roger C. Schlobin was kinder in his assessment, though he still thought that The Sword of Shannara was a disappointment because of its similarities to The Lord of the Rings. Brian Attebery accused The Sword of Shannara of being "undigested Tolkien" which was "especially blatant in its point-for-point correspondence" with The Lord of the Rings. In an educational article on writing, author Orson Scott Card cited The Sword of Shannara as a cautionary example of overly derivative writing, finding the work "artistically displeasing" for this reason.

Tolkien scholar Tom Shippey writes that the novel is distinctive for "the dogged way in which it follows Tolkien point for point". Shippey located analogues for Tolkien characters within Brooks' novel, such as Sauron (Brona), Gandalf (Allanon), the Hobbits (Shea and Flick), Aragorn (Balinor), Boromir (Menion), Gimli (Hendel), Legolas (Durin and Dayel), Gollum (Orl Fane), the Barrow-wight (Mist Wraith), the Nazgûl (Skull Bearers), and Tom Bombadil (King of the Silver River), among others. He also found plot similarities to events in The Lord of the Rings, such as the Fellowship of the Ring's formation and adventures, the journeys to Rivendell (Culhaven) and Lothlórien (Storlock), Gandalf's (Allanon) fall in Moria (Paranor) and subsequent reappearance, and the Rohirrim's arrival at the Battle of the Pelennor Fields (Battle of Tyrsis), among others. Shippey attributes the book's success to the post-Tolkien advent of the fantasy genre: "What The Sword of Shannara seems to show is that many readers had developed the taste ... for heroic fantasy so strongly that if they could not get the real thing they would take any substitute, no matter how diluted."

Terry Brooks has said that Tolkien's works were a major influence in his writing, though he has also said that Tolkien was not his only influence. Other influences included his editor Lester del Rey, as well as the many different books which he had read over his life. Brooks was also inspired by the mythology and ancient civilizations that he had learned about in school.

Author Gene Wolfe defended Brooks' derivation of material from Tolkien in a 2001 Interzone essay: "Terry Brooks has often been disparaged for imitating Tolkien, particularly by those reviewers who find his books inferior to Tolkien's own. I can say only that I wish there were more imitators—we need them—and that all imitations of so great an original must necessarily be inferior." Dune author Frank Herbert also defended Brooks: "Brooks demonstrates that it doesn't matter where you get the idea; what matters is that you tell a rousing story."

John Batchelor feels that it was the weakest of the 1977 surge in fantasy, ranking it below Stephen R. Donaldson's The Chronicles of Thomas Covenant, the Unbeliever, Seamus Cullen's Astra and Flondrix, and The Silmarillion, edited by Christopher Tolkien, while commenting that it "unabashedly copies" Lord of the Rings. The Pittsburgh Press feels that Sword embodies the Tolkien spirit and tradition but is quite able to stand apart from Lord of the Rings.

=== Book impact ===
The Sword of Shannara sold about 125,000 copies in its first year in print, and this success provided a major boost to the fantasy genre. Louise J. Winters writes that "until Shannara, no fantasy writer except J. R. R. Tolkien had made such an impression on the general public." Critic David Pringle said that Brooks "demonstrated in 1977 that the commercial success of Tolkien's The Lord of the Rings had not been a fluke, and that fantasy really did have the potential to become a mass-market genre". Stephen R. Donaldson's The Chronicles of Thomas Covenant, the Unbeliever and The Sword of Shannara ushered in "the era of the big commercial fantasy" and helped make epic fantasy the leading fantasy subgenre. The Sword of Shannara and its sequels helped inspire later versions of Dungeons & Dragons.

== Television adaptation ==
The Shannara books were to be adapted by Mike Newell, the director of Harry Potter and the Goblet of Fire; however, he left the project. The books eventually were adapted for television by Farah Films and executive produced by Brooks, Dan Farah, and Stewart Till. They began with Elfstones, intending to leave Sword for a later date. The Shannara Chronicles premiered on American television network MTV on January 5, 2016.

== Sources ==
- Brooks, Terry (2003). Sometimes The Magic Works: Lessons from a Writing Life. New York: Ballantine. ISBN 0-345-46551-2. OCLC 54854572.
- del Rey, Lester (1980). The World of Science Fiction: 1926-1976 - The History of a Subculture. New York and London: Garland. ISBN 0-8240-1446-4. OCLC 5500269.
- MacRae, Cathi Dunn (1998). Presenting Young Adult Fantasy Fiction. New York City: Twayne Publishers. ISBN 0-8057-8220-6. OCLC 38478522.
- Tymn, Marshall B; Zahorski, Kenneth J.; Boyer, Robert H. (1979). Fantasy Literature: A Core Collection and Reference Guide. New Providence, New Jersey: R.R. Bowker. ISBN 0-8352-1153-3. OCLC 5051748.
