= Terry Brooks =

American fantasy fiction writer (born 1944)

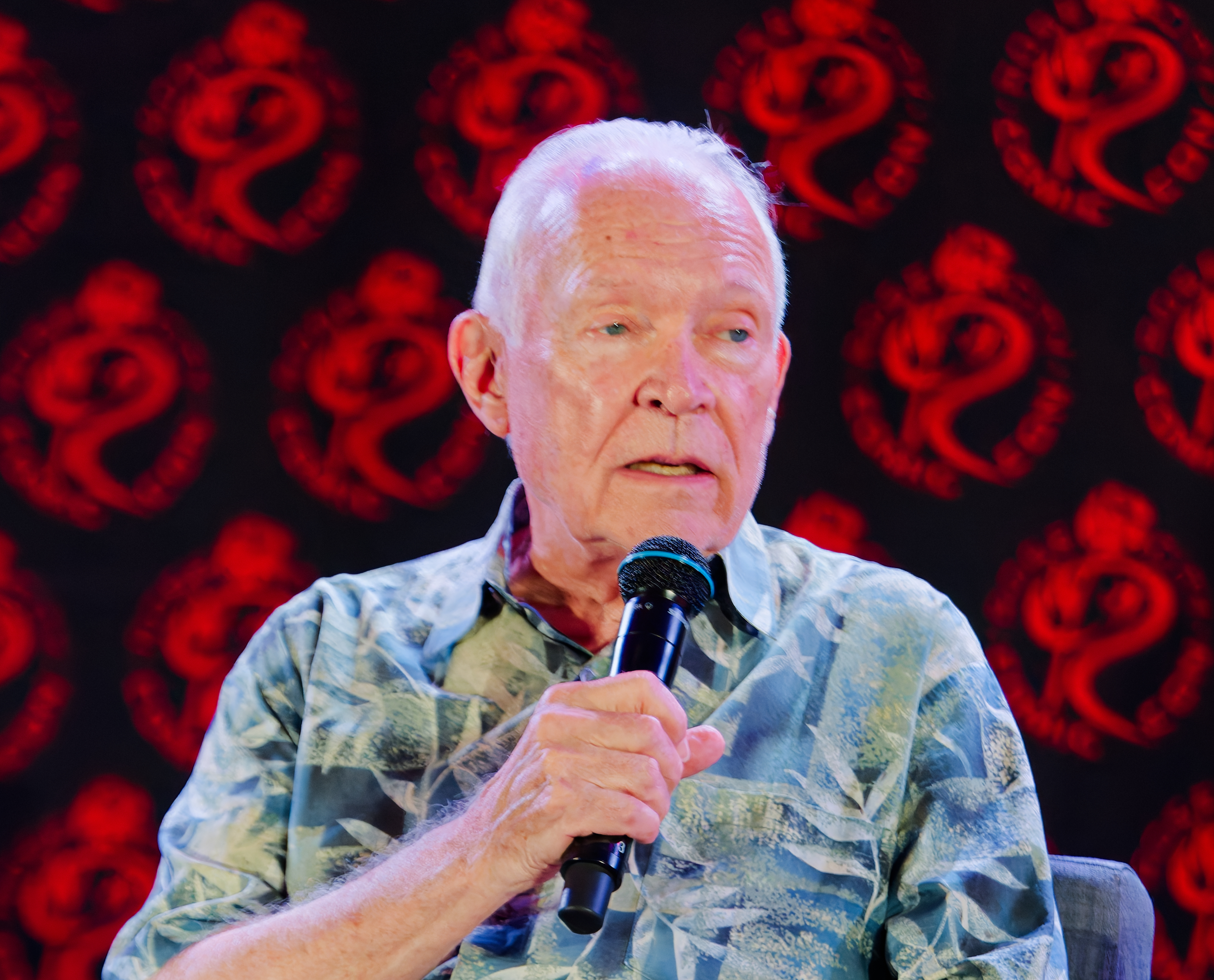
- Brooks at the 2025 Rose City Comic Con
- Born: Terence Dean Brooks; January 8, 1944 (age 82); Sterling, Illinois, U.S.
- Education: Hamilton College (BA); Washington and Lee University (JD)
- Occupations: Author, former attorney
- Spouse: Judine Brooks
- Writing career
- Genres: Epic fantasy, urban fantasy
- Notable awards: World Fantasy Award—Life Achievement, Inkpot Award (1997)
- Website: terrybrooks.net

Terence Dean Brooks (born January 8, 1944) is an American writer of fantasy fiction. He writes mainly epic fantasy, and has also written two film novelizations. He has written 23 New York Times bestsellers during his writing career, and has sold over 25 million copies of his books in print. He is one of the most successful living fantasy writers. In March 2025, he announced his semi-retirement from writing.

== Early life ==
Brooks was born in the rural Midwestern town of Sterling, Illinois, and spent a large part of his life living there. He is an alumnus of Hamilton College, earning his B.A. in English literature in 1966. He later obtained a J.D. degree from Washington and Lee University. He was a practicing attorney before becoming a full-time author.

== Career ==
Brooks had been a writer since high school, writing mainly in the genres of science fiction, western, fiction, and non-fiction. One day, in his early college life, he was given a copy of The Lord of the Rings by J. R. R. Tolkien, which inspired him to write in one genre. While Tolkien inspired the genre, Brooks stated during his TEDxRainier talk "Why I Write about Elves", as well as at the Charlotte Literary Festival that he credits the inspiration of his style of writing to William Faulkner's works. With this inspiration, he then made his debut in 1977 with The Sword of Shannara.

After finishing two sequels to The Sword of Shannara, Brooks moved on to the series which would become known as the Landover novels. Brooks then wrote a four-book series titled The Heritage of Shannara. For the next fourteen years, he wrote more Landover books, then went on to write The Word and Void trilogy. Continuing the Shannara series, Brooks wrote the prequel to The Sword of Shannara, titled First King of Shannara. He then wrote two series, The Voyage of the Jerle Shannara and High Druid of Shannara and finished a third, Genesis of Shannara, a trilogy bridging his Word and Void and Shannara series. The sixth book in the Landover series, A Princess of Landover, was released in August 2009. Returning to Shannara, a duology, Legends of Shannara, taking place after the events of Genesis of Shannara, was written next. The first book, entitled Bearers of the Black Staff, was released in August 2010 and the second, The Measure of the Magic, was released in August 2011. He next completed a trilogy entitled The Dark Legacy of Shannara. The three books are; Wards of Faerie (Feb 2013), Bloodfire Quest (June 2013), and Witch Wraith (Dec 2013). He followed this with the trilogy Defenders of Shannara, which include The High Druid's Blade (July 2014), The Darkling Child (June 2015), and The Sorcerer's Daughter (May 24, 2016). He then wrote the final and concluding tetralogy of the Shannara series known as The Fall of Shannara. The first book in the tetralogy is The Black Elfstone and was released on June 13, 2017. The second book in the series is The Skaar Invasion released on June 19, 2018. The third book in the series is The Stiehl Assassin published on May 28, 2019. The fourth and final book in the tetralogy is The Last Druid, published on October 20, 2020. In March 2025, Brooks announced his semi-retirement and that Delilah S. Dawson would be taking on the authorship of his Shannara legendarium going forward.

A television series based on the Shannara works, entitled The Shannara Chronicles, began showing on MTV in January 2016. The show starts with the second book of the original series, Elfstones, as there are strong female roles which did not appear in the first book. The second season aired in 2017 on Spike TV. On January 16, 2018, it was announced that the series had been cancelled after two seasons. Producers later announced that the series is being shopped to other networks.

Brooks has written a number of other books, based on movies, science fiction and his own life. Novels include Hook, based on the movie of the same name, first published November 24, 1991, and republished in 1998. Star Wars Episode I: The Phantom Menace was published April 21, 1999, with four differing dust jacket covers. His own writing life is reflected in two stories, Sometimes the Magic Works: Lessons from a Writing Life, published February 3, 2004, and Why I Write About Elves published in 2005. A science fiction book, Street Freaks, was released on October 2, 2018. Brooks has written a number of e-book short stories which are published in a book titled Small Magic with his other short stories.

Brooks received a World Fantasy Award for Life Achievement in 2017. He won an Inkpot Award in 1997. He was also nominated for six Locus Awards.

In March 2025 he announced he was retiring. He connected with Delilah Dawson, a well-established fantasy author, in order to continue the Shannara series.

== Personal life ==
Brooks resides in Seattle, Washington, with his wife, Judine.

== Novels versus short stories ==
After writing "Indomitable", a short story constituting an epilogue to The Wishsong of Shannara, Terry Brooks declared:

I find it much harder to write short stories than long fiction. I feel cramped by the lack of space and the dictates of the form. There is considerable difference in long and short fiction disciplines, and I am not good with the latter. I hope not to have to do many more of them, but you never know. I must have written "Indomitable" anywhere from four to five times, each effort different. Give me a five hundred page sprawl as an assignment any day.

== See also ==
- Shannara
- Magic Kingdom of Landover
