= The Elfstones of Shannara =

1982 epic fantasy novel by Terry Brooks

- First hardcover edition.
- Author: Terry Brooks
- Illustrator: Darrell K. Sweet
- Cover artist: Darrell K. Sweet
- Language: English
- Series: Original Shannara Trilogy
- Genre: Epic fantasy
- Publisher: Del Rey Books
- Publication date: 1982
- Publication place: United States
- Media type: Print (hardback & paperback, mass market paperback)
- Pages: 576 (mass market paperback)
- ISBN: 0-345-30253-2 (1st edition hardcover) ISBN 0-345-28554-9 (mass market paperback)
- OCLC: 7976998
- Dewey Decimal: 813/.54 19
- LC Class: PS3552.R6596 E5 1982
- Preceded by: The Sword of Shannara
- Followed by: The Wishsong of Shannara

The Elfstones of Shannara is a 1982 epic fantasy novel by American writer Terry Brooks. It is the first sequel to The Sword of Shannara and the second book in The Original Shannara Trilogy. It expands upon the history of the Elves, which was only hinted at in the preceding story, and follows Wil Ohmsford, grandson of Shea (the hero of the first book) and inheritor of the Shannara Elfstones.

The novel, set in a fictional world called the Four Lands, consists of two intertwining plotlines. The first plotline follows the quest of protagonists Wil Ohmsford and Amberle Elessedil to create a new Ellcrys, a magical tree that serves to banish all Demons from the Four Lands. To do this, they must locate a specific place in the Four Lands called Safehold, where the process of creating a new Ellcrys can begin. The second plotline focuses on the efforts of the Elven army and their allies to slow a massive Demon invasion, made possible by the dying of the current Ellcrys, to give Wil and Amberle enough time to complete their quest.

== Background ==
After Terry Brooks had completed all work on his first novel, The Sword of Shannara, in fall 1975—having begun it in 1967—he began work on another book soon after. The plot he originally chose featured the son of Menion Leah as the protagonist and a girl with a Siren-like song that could manipulate the properties of objects around her. Brooks outlined about three-quarters of the story before beginning to write; he refused an attempt by Lester del Rey to see it because Brooks wanted to impress the editor. When Brooks finished three-quarters of the tale in fall 1977 after writing around his law practice hours, he found himself stuck and could not think of a suitable ending. He decided to send the story to del Rey to get his opinion on what the end should be. The reply he received was quite unexpected; del Rey firmly believed that Brooks needed to simply get rid of the started novel and start anew due to a plethora of problems he saw. Once del Rey finished a full line-by-line examination of the plot, Brooks leafed through the comments and found them to be disturbingly accurate.

So, Brooks started over. This time, he created an outline for the full story and mailed it to del Rey and his wife for comments prior to delving into the writing process once more. In his frustration about the old story, though, he decided to forget about his former protagonist—even that character's entire generation. Instead, he gave the protagonist role to the grandson of the hero in Sword, Wil Ohmsford. In place of the siren-oriented tale, he took on the history of the Elves. del Rey approved this new plan, and Brooks began weaving the tale in late 1978. He finished it in late 1980 and sent it off to del Rey. He replied in February 1981 with 25 single-spaced pages-worth of errors or problems, including a roughly 200-page span where he felt that the action and dialogue was seen from the author's viewpoint—not a character's. To address this, Brooks used Ander Elessedil, formerly a minor character with little impact on the plot, and turned him into the focus of a majority of the book. Four months later, he sent the story out once again. This time it only required minor alterations.

== Plot ==
=== History ===
Before the dawn of mankind was the age of Faerie, an era from which many powerful spirits (such as the King of the Silver River) came. The Elves, extremely long-lived and possessing great magic, created the Elfstones. As a necessary balance to the light, darkness was also created in the beginning of time; from this darkness the Demons were born. After years of battle between the light and the dark, the Elves summoned their greatest magic and created the Forbidding, a spell that imprisoned the Demons beyond the confines of the world. They also created the Ellcrys, a beautiful silver tree with crimson leaves to maintain the Forbidding. Unfortunately, this drained nearly all the strength of the Elves, leaving them with very little magic. Most of the creatures of Faerie died out in this period of waning magic; yet the Elves survived, though diminished in splendor. In time, they came to resemble more and more the human race that had recently evolved, both in strength and longevity. Afraid of the rapidly multiplying humans, Elves went into hiding, remaining one with nature, ever guarding the Ellcrys. Even when mankind nearly destroyed the world in the Great Wars, the Elves lived on, spending their last remaining magic to save the Ellcrys. In the aftermath of the destruction, as mankind split into "four" distinct races, the Elves took that opportunity to come out from hiding. Indeed, most believed that the Elves were just another offshoot of mankind, like the Dwarves, Gnomes and Trolls. The Elves emerged as leaders in the new world; it was the Elf Galaphile who summoned the first Druid council at Paranor.

=== Present ===
The magical Ellcrys tree was beginning to die, thus weakening the spell that held the Forbidding. The Ellcrys spoke to the Chosen, telling them of a rebirth, a process which enables a new tree to be born—but this can only be done at the fountain of the Bloodfire. The Chosen then inform their Prince Ander Elessedil and King Eventine Elessedil of the matter. However, no one knows of the location of the Bloodfire. A search in the ancient Elven library reveals one reference to the Bloodfire. It states that it lies in a place named "Safehold". At the same time, a powerful Demon, the Dagda Mor, escapes from the waning Forbidding, bringing with it two other demons named the Reaper and the Changeling. The Dagda Mor then sends the Reaper to kill all the Chosen, and the Changeling to act as a spy for the demons within the Elven city. Eventine finds himself at a loss, for only the Chosen can make the rebirth of the Ellcrys happen.

The Druid Allanon appeared, telling Eventine that his coming must remain a secret, and promising to find out the location of Safehold. He went to the ancient Druid keep, Paranor, in an attempt to locate Safehold. After learning its location, Allanon was ambushed by the Dagda Mor and a handful of Furies.

He retreated to Storlock for a time, and then went to Havenstead with Wil Ohmsford—who is a Healer, a descendant of Jerle Shannara and bearer of the Elfstones—to find Amberle Elessedil, who is King Eventine's granddaughter and a Chosen, who abandoned her duty to the Ellcrys and fled the Elven capital, Arborlon. She eventually agreed to return to Arborlon with them, only giving in when Demon Wolves were closing in upon them.

En route, close to the Silver River, Allanon, Amberle and Wil were ambushed by Demon wolves. Allanon fended off the Demons while Wil and Amberle escaped to safety. The King of the Silver River took them in and sheltered them just before they would have been caught; after talking with him, the duo discover they have been transported miles away from where they started, and have no idea if Allanon survived or where he was. They decided to continue on to Arborlon and hoped to meet him there, but on the way their horse was stolen by Rovers, a group of people who travel in caravans and recognize no laws but their own. Wil insisted that they get the horse back, and ingratiated himself to the Rovers and their leader Cephelo by using his skills as healer to help some of the sick or mildly injured members of the family. He met Eretria, a beautiful Rover girl Cephelo said was his daughter; in reality, she was not his daughter at all and would be sold now that she was of an age to marry. She was immediately attracted to Wil and wanted to help him get the horse back, if he promised to take her with him when he escaped. A giant demon attacked the caravan and Wil was forced to use the Elfstones to defend the Rovers, finally destroying the demon, but damaging himself somehow in a way he did not understand. Cephelo was angry with him, but let him and Amberle leave with their horse. Eretria was left behind but promised to Wil that they would meet again. After being pursued by demons, Wil and Amberle managed to regroup with Allanon and return to Arborlon. Amberle received a seed from the dying Ellcrys and prepared to go to Safehold with Wil, six Elven companions and the Captain of the Home Guard, Crispin.

After they journeyed by boat to the Elven outpost at Drey Wood, the group found the entire garrison that had been stationed at the outpost dead—and the Reaper, who had killed all of them. They managed to escape by setting off down the river once more, but two of the Elven guards were run down and killed in the process. Wil realized that there must have been a spy in Arborlon, and that if the spy knew about Drey Wood, then it was likely their mission was known and they would be pursued the entire way. The party then goes to the Matted Brakes, where another two of the group are killed by an unknown massive creature. After escaping from the Brakes, the remaining group of five found themselves at an ancient Elven fortress named Pykon. The group made the decision to rest the night there, but the Reaper found them again and killed the final two Elven hunters. Wil and Amberle ran into the network of tunnels inside of the Pykon to try to find Crispin, who had gone into there to try to find a way out. Wil and Amberle finally lost the Reaper by destroying a bridge over a gorge, but they lost Crispin as well. During the battle, Wil failed to unlock the power of the Elfstones and believed that his human blood was blocking him from using them. He was resigned to not being able to use the stones anymore, and decided that they would just have to get along without them. The duo met the young Wing Rider Perk soon after, who agreed to take them into the Wilderun on his Roc, Genewen. He also agreed to fly over the Hollows every day for a week in case the duo had need of his help.

Meanwhile, Allanon and the Elves went to war with the Demons, beginning the War of the Forbidding. The Elven army took up two positions in two mountain passes named Halys Cut and Worl Run. Having no weapons, the Demons used human-wave tactics in the ensuing battles and literally ran over the Elven army, even managing to injure King Eventine. Ander's older brother, Arion Elessedil, was killed as well in Worl Run. Defeated, the Elven force retreated first to Baen Draw, successfully defending it until it was discovered that they were being flanked. They then retreated to Arborlon, their last line of defense. In the process, they lost their commander, Kael Pindanon. Shortly after their return to Arborlon, Dwarf and Troll contingents joined them, uniting banners from all four of the Four Lands for the first time in history. Eventine was recovering in his room when the Changeling, disguised for months as Eventine's pet dog Manx, tried to kill the old king in his bed. Eventine killed the Demon, but was badly wounded and near death.

Amberle and Wil traveled to Grimpen Ward, a town of thieves and cutthroats in the Wilderun. Wil caused a stir by healing an old innkeeper woman and jokingly claiming he did it with magic. Thieves try to rob him and Amberle, but they were rescued by Cephelo and Eretria. Wil told Cephelo of his need to go to the Hollows, claiming it was for a rare medicine for Eventine's granddaughter. Cephelo takes them to Hebel, an old hermit who lives in the Wilderun. Hebel recognized the name Safehold and knew where it was; under a lonely mountain in the hollows, the domain of the Witch Sisters. Wil and Amberle went on despite Hebel's warnings, after parting ways with the Rovers. They soon found out that the Elfstones were stolen by Cephelo, and that he had wanted them ever since he had seen Wil use them on the demon that attacked the caravan. Wil left Amberle at the edge of the Hollows and pursued Cephelo. Eretria once again helped Wil to locate Cephelo, only to find that he and the rest of his followers were killed by the Reaper. Wil regained the Elfstones and traveled back to the rim of the Hollows with Eretria. He found Amberle missing. Hebel appeared and agreed to track Amberle for Wil. Together with Hebel's dog, Drifter, they tracked Amberle to the witch Mallenroh's tower. Mallenroh captured them and decided to keep the Elfstones for herself, locking up Wil and the rest as prisoners until Wil agreed to give her the stones.

Mallenroh's identical twin sister Morag arrived, and the Witch Sisters fought and killed each other. Wil, Eretria, Hebel, and Drifter escaped with Amberle, the Elfstones, and Mallenroh's servant, Wisp; who brought them to the Bloodfire. Amberle both absorbed the Bloodfire and bathed the seed of the Ellcrys in it. The Reaper attacked them and killed Wisp, but Wil destroyed it by realizing that it wasn't his human blood preventing the use of the Elfstones, but because he was afraid of them and had formed a mental block against using them. He broke the block, focusing the power of the Elfstones upon the Reaper's cloaked face and destroying it. Wil had Eretria call Perk, who brought Wil, Amberle and Eretria back to Arborlon while Hebel returned home.

By this point, the Demons had begun a full frontal assault upon Arborlon. Despite desperate attempts to blunt the attacks, the seven gates fell one by one to the superior numbers of the Demons. The Demons eventually broke through the last of the Elven capital's major defenses (the seventh gate). At this point, Allanon engaged and defeated the Dagda Mor in a titanic battle while the forces of "good", now severely depleted, regrouped at their last line of defense: the Gardens of Life, where the Ellcrys resided. The Demons tried to reach the Ellcrys to destroy her, but they were held back by those forces of "good" just long enough so that Wil and Amberle could fly in. Amberle touched the dead Ellcrys and was transformed into the new Ellcrys; and with this action, Amberle restored the Forbidding, banishing the Demons back to their alternate universe. It was revealed by Allanon to Wil that he knew all along that Amberle would become the new Ellcrys. Wil was angry and told Allanon he should have been honest, but Allanon claimed that she would not have believed him. He reminds Wil that Amberle knew what would happen and made the choice herself, and that no one forced her. She did what only she could do, and in so doing saved humanity from the Demons. Wil was still bitter about the deception, because he had loved Amberle and didn't want to lose her the way he had. It is then revealed that Allanon has aged, because he used too much of the magic in the fighting with the Demons. He said he was going to Paranor to sleep, and then left in the middle of the night without seeing or speaking with anyone else.

Eventine died, and Ander became the new King. With the Demons banished once again, the survivors of the war returned to their homes. Wil visited the Ellcrys and came to terms with Amberle's sacrifice. He then left Arborlon to continue his studies as a healer, taking Eretria with him.

== Television adaptation ==
By 2008, the rights to movie adaptations for all of the Shannara novels were sold to Warner Bros until 2010. Those rights expired, though Brooks continued to receive inquiries from film studios. In 2011, adaptation plans coalesced around a Game of Thrones-style series, backed by Sonar Entertainment and Farah Films, and executive produced by Brooks, Dan Farah, and Stewart Till. The story would begin with Elfstones, leaving Sword, the first book in the series, for later. By 2012, they were looking for a showrunner and director before pitching to network buyers, at which time they hoped to move into production.

In December 2013, Deadline Hollywood reported that MTV had given a script-to-series commitment to produce the show, with Jon Favreau directing, Smallville creators Al Gough and Miles Millar writing, and Brooks and Farah as executive producers. The result was The Shannara Chronicles, which premiered on January 5, 2016, on MTV. In an interview, Brooks mentioned his pleasure with how his story has been adapted. In January 2018, the series was cancelled after two seasons. Producers said that they would shop the series to other networks.

== Characters ==
- Wil Ohmsford – Grandson of the legendary Shea Ohmsford, Wil is a good-hearted, calm young man. He takes after his grandfather in looks, with his fair hair and the pointed ears that mark him as having Elven blood. Unlike Shea who is quite callow before his adventures, Wil has a more mature outlook, partly due to the early death of his parents. Their untimely passing inspired him to train with the renowned Gnome Healers at Storlock, and due to his persistence he was eventually allowed to train there despite not being a Gnome. Because Wil has only a small fraction of Elven blood, mastery of the legendary Elfstones does not come as easily to him as it did to Shea, and this coupled with his own fear of the Elfstones' magic and his internal conflict over doing harm after having pledged his life to being a Healer hampers his ability to use them effectively.
- Allanon – The powerful last Druid of Paranor, this human has mastered many forms of magic and is perfectly willing to hide most or all of the truth from those he protects or leads in order to achieve his goals. Together with Shea Ohmsford and others he defeated the Warlock Lord in the most recent War of the Races. Now, fifty years later, Allanon has returned, apparently without having aged a single day, and he gives Wil Ohmsford the job of protecting Amberle Elessedil.
- Amberle Elessedil – An Elven princess and the granddaughter of the current King of the Elves, Eventine Elessedil. She is the daughter of his youngest son, Aine (deceased). Selected by the Ellcrys to be a member of the Chosen, Amberle at first enjoys the attention from the Ellcrys but soon becomes disturbed by the sentient tree's overbearing nature and her relationship to it, and she spurns her duty as a Chosen and leaves the Elven city of Arborlon. She is later convinced by Allanon and Wil to return to Arborlon, and she ultimately decides to take on the job of restoring the Ellcrys.
- Eventine Elessedil – King of the Elves who worked with Allanon and Shea Ohmsford to defeat the Warlock Lord. Fifty years later, he is still the leader of the Elves and still a strong, capable man despite his age. He has three sons; Arion, Ander, and Aine (deceased).
- Ander Elessedil – Son of Eventine, and uncle of Amberle.
- Eretria – a human girl raised since childhood by the rover Cephelo, giving a lot of trouble to Wil and the Elves but eventually becoming their ally in their mission to restore the Ellcrys' health.
- Stee Jans – Known as the "Iron Man", he commands the legendary Free Corps of the Border Legion. This small but fierce force is sent to aid the Elves and they play a pivotal role in the defense of the Westland during the War of the Forbidding.
- The Ellcrys – A magical and sentient tree with silver bark and crimson red leaves, created by Elves eons ago in the midst of a great war in order to banish the Demons to a dimension called the Forbidding. So long as she stands and remains healthy, the Ellcrys will keep the Demons locked away in the Forbidding. The Ellcrys does age and die, requiring a rebirth, but its lifespan is on the order of centuries and millennia. As the tree weakens, the seal keeping Demons locked away in the Forbidding also weakens. She can communicate telepathically and can move her branches to touch people in greeting. Her bark is warm to the touch and she can give pieces of herself if necessary, as when she produced an "Ellcrys staff" for Allanon. Every year the Ellcrys chooses a select group of young Elves called the Chosen to care for her. The Chosen are almost always men; Amberle Elessedil is the first woman selected in centuries.
- Dagda Mor (demon) –
- Changeling (demon)
- The Reaper (demon)
