= The Sword of Shannara Trilogy =

Book trilogy by Terry Brooks

- The cover of The Sword of Shannara Trilogy
- The Sword of Shannara (1977); The Elfstones of Shannara (1982); The Wishsong of Shannara (1985)
- Author: Terry Brooks
- Illustrator: The Brothers Hildebrandt; Darrell K. Sweet
- Cover artist: The Brothers Hildebrandt; Darrell K. Sweet
- Country: United States
- Language: English
- Publisher: Ballantine Books; Del Rey Books
- Published: 1977 - 1985
- Media type: Print (Hardcover and Paperback)
- No. of books: 3

The Sword of Shannara Trilogy consists of the first three Shannara novels (The Sword of Shannara, The Elfstones of Shannara and The Wishsong of Shannara) by Terry Brooks. Though not originally written as a trilogy, the novels were published as The Sword of Shannara Trilogy by Del Rey Books.

The second book was later adapted into a television series titled The Shannara Chronicles, created by Alfred Gough and Miles Millar. The first season aired on MTV, following the plot of The Elfstones of Shannara; the second season aired on Spike TV, continuing the story with an original plot. The show was canceled after two seasons.

== Books ==
=== The Sword of Shannara ===
The first novel of The Original Shannara Trilogy chronicles the adventures of the brothers Shea and Flick Ohmsford in their quest to retrieve the Sword of Shannara to defeat the Warlock Lord who threatens the Four Lands.

=== The Elfstones of Shannara ===
The second novel of The Original Shannara Trilogy follows Shea's grandson, Wil Ohmsford, as he aids the endangered Elven nation, helping it survive a horde of demons coming through from their sealed-off dimension, the Forbidding.

=== The Wishsong of Shannara ===
The final novel of The Original Shannara Trilogy details the quest of Jair and Brin Ohmsford, the children of Wil and Eretria, to save the Four Lands from the evil magic within a tome called the Ildatch.

== Characters who appear in multiple books ==
Few characters appear in more than one novel in the trilogy, though many references to previous characters are evident. Those who appear in multiple books include:

- Allanon (all three books)
- Eventine Elessedil (Sword and Elfstones)
- Flick Ohmsford (Sword and Elfstones)
- Wil Ohmsford (Elfstones and Wishsong)
- Eretria (Elfstones and Wishsong)
- The King of the Silver River (all three books)
