= Eretria (Shannara) =

- Shannara character
- Ivana Baquero as Eretria
- First appearance: Novel: The Elfstones of Shannara; Television: "Chosen" (Episode 1.01)
- Last appearance: Novel: The Wishsong of Shannara; Television:
- Created by: Character; Terry Brooks; Television producers Miles Millar; Alfred Gough
- Portrayed by: Ivana Baquero

In-universe information
- Full name: Eretria Ohmsford
- Family: Brin (daughter), Jair (son)

Eretria is a fictional character from the Shannara series of fantasy novels by Terry Brooks and their television adaptation. In the latter, she is portrayed by Ivana Baquero. Described as "a delicate balance of strength and sensitivity", she is introduced as a cocky young woman from a clan of thieves. Though she initially displays a callous facade, Eretria eventually reveals a compassionate side.

Eretria has received praise from numerous critics. During the first season of the television show, Baquero revealed her fondness for the role, citing depth and character development.

== Novel series ==
The Shannara novels are set during a future in which modern civilization has fallen and Earth is governed by various races, including humans, elves, dwarves, and others. In the second novel, The Elfstones of Shannara, a teenaged princess named Amberle and the magic-user Wil must renew a spell which protects the world from demons. They are eventually joined by Eretria, an orphaned girl enslaved by thieves.

=== Story lines ===
Having grown up in the thieving Rover clan, Eretria possesses a number of stealth-related skills, and is also trained in the ways of combat, particularly with daggers. She is described as a slender brunette with seductive eyes, and is considered extremely beautiful within the Shannara series. Due to her various attributes, she generally displays a proud, spunky personality. In The Elfstones of Shannara, it is revealed that she had tailed Wil in secret for a day, "then smiled wickedly as she saw the look that appeared on his face".

Wil eventually learns that Eretria is seeking independence from the Rovers, and the two become closer. When her clan is slaughtered mysteriously, Eretria is freed and chooses to accompany Wil and Amberle. Once the group succeeds in repelling the demons, Wil invites Eretria to his homeland, and she accepts. In the follow-up novel, The Wishsong of Shannara, it is revealed that they are married and have two children.

== Television series ==
In 2016, the Shannara novels were adapted into a television series called The Shannara Chronicles. The first season adapts the second novel, The Elfstones of Shannara, bypassing the first book, The Sword of Shannara. In an interview with USA Today, Shannara creator Terry Brooks stated, "I felt that Sword was too male-dominated", and noted that The Elfstones of Shannara has a love triangle, "a great ending and just a better story all around".

=== Casting ===
Press releases described Eretria (Ivana Baquero) as "a young woman from the wrong side of the tracks who's been forced to use her beauty and wits to survive".

Series producer Alfred Gough described the role of Eretria as the hardest part to cast. Co-producer Miles Millar noted, "We were down to the wire, about to start shooting, and we hadn't cast Eretria yet". Millar remarked that the creators had become deeply fascinated by the character. "In the books, she almost instantly falls in love with Wil and follows him the whole time. But she actually has a really dark, tragic story. Her life has been really harsh. We wanted to get into that and make sure that she felt like a real full dimensional character. She was the one that really intrigued us in terms of finding more complexity and more shades for her", he said.

In January 2015, Ivana Baquero, a longtime fantasy fan, won the part of Eretria. The character's stature was expanded significantly beyond her part in the novels. Austin Butler was cast as Wil. Millar stated that the producers were fans of Baquero's film Pan's Labyrinth, noting that "she came in and did this incredible chemistry read with Austin. They had that magical chemistry between them and it made our lives easier." The Los Angeles Times also noted that Baquero was seasoned in roles involving "feminist empowerment".

As in the novels, Eretria has been raised and trained by the Rover clan, who maintain her services against her will. She often carries out missions while seeking money or freedom, but occasionally acts against her leader. Though she is initially driven by personal gain, she gradually develops a more compassionate nature. While describing the character, Baquero stated, "She goes on this quest to save the world, but in that quest she also discovers herself".

In an interview with the Los Angeles Times, Millar noted that the character would have "real problems, real dilemmas, [and] real strength that will all be relatable to a contemporary female audience".

=== Season 1 ===
Upon meeting Wil, Eretria saves his life during an encounter with a troll, then charms him while seeking to steal his possessions. A humorous tension develops afterward, with Wil growing distrustful of Eretria while feeling attracted to her as well. In an interview, Austin Butler noted, "That makes the relationship fun in a way, because there’s this seductive quality to her. She's really good at getting in somebody's mind, especially Wil's. So it's fun to watch their dynamic now that he's doing his best to put up this wall".

After helping the Rovers capture Amberle and Wil, Eretria is finally granted her freedom, but returns to help Wil and Amberle escape. "She sees things like Wil putting his life on the line for her and Amberle, and she starts growing a conscience of her own", Baquero stated. "In those situations where you're put in an extreme situation, you just react by instinct. And I think her natural instinct is that of a good person". Baquero described Eretria's compassion as "something that she learns along the way, and that's what's so beautiful about the character, quite frankly".

After freeing Amberle and Wil, Eretria joins the mission, and the three endeavor to create a spell that will protect the world from demons. The group is then captured in a fortress, where Eretria uses her skills to initiate another escape, and later rescues the others from a beast called the Reaper.

As the journey nears its end, it is revealed that Eretria's blood is a key factor in creating the required spell. She loses consciousness amidst the process, but is soon revived by Wil's magic. She later fights off a group of trolls in order to help Wil and Amberle complete the mission, sharing a kiss with Wil before separating from him. Afterward, Amberle creates the new spell that repels the demons, which requires her to become one with a tree called the Ellcrys. After mourning Amberle’s loss, Wil embarks on a quest to find Eretria.

=== Season 2 ===
Prior to the show's second season, Baquero discussed her enthusiasm for the project, noting, "I've always wanted to do fantasy and be part of this genre, and to have a character like Eretria to portray is definitely very cool". She also stated that the series would reveal more about Eretria's link to the supernatural spell, along with her history in general. In the season, Eretria is seeing Lyria, a young woman who's revealed to be a princess. They stay a couple despite Lyria's mother wishing Lyria to marry a king to secure a political alliance. Lyria later asks Eretria to marry her.

== Reception ==
In an article on The Elfstones of Shannara, review website BiblioSanctum.com noted that Eretria "adds some much needed fire to the threesome". Hugo Award winner Aidan Moher expressed fondness for the romantic story line between Eretria and Wil. In a review of the television series, TV Guide's Megan Vick stated that "By the end of the first episode, Eretria will inevitably be your favorite thanks to her no-nonsense attitude and handy work with a knife". Sara Netzley of Entertainment Weekly noted that "Ivana Baquero brings an intriguing fierceness to the role".

In February 2016, Space posted an online article titled "5 Reasons We Need Eretria To Survive On The Shannara Chronicles". One of the reasons given was "She becomes more interesting every single week". Similarly, Voice of TV posted an article titled "Why Everyone Loves Eretria", and stated that "she is the main one who makes everything interesting", citing her development through the season. AfterEllen.com expressed interest in the television character's bisexuality, which is revealed during the sixth episode. When the first season concluded, another article from the site expressed disappointment that the matter was not further explored. Some reviewers praised this departure from the books, with the fact that the show portrays her sexuality as wholly accepted commented on approvingly.

In a review of the fifth episode, Terri Schwartz of IGN.com praised the producers for "bringing Eretria to the forefront". While reflecting on the first season, Terry Brooks, author of the Shannara novels, noted that Baquero "was wonderful. Eretria has to be fiery and difficult, and she caught that well".
