= The Shannara Chronicles =

2016 American fantasy drama television series

- Genre: Fantasy
- Created by: Alfred Gough; Miles Millar
- Based on: The Sword of Shannara Trilogy by Terry Brooks
- Starring: Austin Butler; Poppy Drayton; Ivana Baquero; Manu Bennett; Aaron Jakubenko; Marcus Vanco; Malese Jow; Vanessa Morgan; Gentry White
- Opening theme: "Until We Go Down" by Ruelle
- Composers: Felix Erskine; Lukas Burton
- Country of origin: United States
- Original language: English
- No. of seasons: 2
- No. of episodes: 20

Production
- Executive producers: Dan Farah; Terry Brooks; Eugene Stein; Stewart Till; Jon Favreau; Jonathan Liebesman; Alfred Gough; Miles Millar
- Producers: Jenna Glazier; David Gardner; Tim Coddington; Tim Scanlan
- Production location: New Zealand
- Cinematography: Michael Bonvillain; Rodney Charters
- Editors: Peter Gvozdas; Chris Peppe; Josh Beal
- Running time: 40–43 minutes
- Production companies: Farah Films; Millar Gough Ink; Raygun One; Sonar Entertainment; MTV Production Development

Original release
- Network: MTV (2016); Spike (2017)
- Release: January 5, 2016 – November 22, 2017

The Shannara Chronicles is an American fantasy drama television series created by Alfred Gough and Miles Millar. It is an adaptation of The Sword of Shannara trilogy of fantasy novels by Terry Brooks. It follows three heroes as they seek to protect an ancient tree to stop the escape of banished demons. The series was filmed in the Auckland Film Studios and on location elsewhere in New Zealand.

The first season of The Shannara Chronicles premiered on MTV in the United States on January 5, 2016, and consisted of 10 episodes. MTV originally greenlit a second season in April 2016 and in May 2017, it was announced that the series would relocate to Spike (now Paramount Network). The second season premiered on October 11, 2017, and concluded November 22, 2017. On January 16, 2018, it was announced that the series had been cancelled after two seasons and that the producers were shopping the series to other networks. The series was later considered officially concluded.

== Plot ==
Season 1 of The Shannara Chronicles roughly follows the storylines set out in the novel The Elfstones of Shannara, (the second book of the Shannara trilogy) set in the fictional Four Lands. As the series opens, demons start to return after having been banished from this world to a place known as the Forbidding—locked by an ancient tree called the Ellcrys. The series chronicles the journey of Wil, Amberle, and Eretria who, with the guidance of the last druid Allanon, must embark on a quest to protect the Ellcrys from dying and prevent releasing all the banished demons back into the Four Lands.

== Cast and characters ==
=== Main ===
- Austin Butler as Wil Ohmsford, a half-human/half-elf who is the last of the bloodline of the ancient Shannara family. He is destined to help save the Four Lands from demons. He possesses three Elfstones, which belonged to his late father, Shea Ohmsford.
- Poppy Drayton as Amberle Elessedil, the Elven Princess and the first female to be accepted as one of the Chosen, a group of elves responsible for protecting and caring for the Ellcrys tree.
- Ivana Baquero as Eretria, a human who was raised by Rovers, a band of thieves. Although at first untrustworthy, she later becomes a stalwart ally of the group. She also has romantic feelings for Wil, and becomes involved with the Princess of Leah, Lyria, in the second season.
- Manu Bennett as Allanon, a human and the last druid, who has been alive for more than 300 years through the use of Druid Sleep. He guides and mentors the group on their quest to protect the Ellcrys. In season 2, Bennett also portrays the Warlock Lord.
- Aaron Jakubenko as Ander Elessedil, youngest son of King Eventine, who has a reputation for being irresponsible, due to the death of older brother Aine, as he blames himself for his brother's death, despite the fact it was not his fault. However, after his father and other brother Arion have also died, Ander becomes king of the elves; finally abandoning his irresponsible party boy nature, becoming the responsible ruler his kingdom needs.
- Marcus Vanco as Bandon, an Elven boy with the gift of a seer, meaning that he can see possible futures when he touches someone.
- Malese Jow as Mareth Ravenlock (season 2), a half-human/half-elf searching for Allanon because she believes herself to be his daughter. She, too eventually develops romantic feelings towards Wil.
- Vanessa Morgan as Lyria (season 2), a human who is in a romantic relationship with Eretria, and who is revealed to be the Princess of Leah.
- Gentry White as Garet Jax (season 2), a bounty hunter looking for Lyria for her mother, the Queen of Leah. Later on he joins Wil's group in saving the Four Lands.

=== Recurring ===
- James Remar as Cephelo (season 1), the leader of the Rovers and adoptive father of Eretria. Upon first seeing Wil's Elfstones, Cephelo becomes obsessed with them. Despite his self-serving nature, he later helps Amberle on her quest.
- Daniel MacPherson as Arion Elessedil (season 1), oldest living son of King Eventine and heir to the Elven throne. Arion is known to be hot-tempered and often disagrees with his father's commands.
- Jed Brophy as the Dagda Mor (season 1), an ancient elvish druid who turned into a demon. His powers increase as the Ellcrys dies, and as such he uses lesser demons as henchmen and proxies.
- Brooke Williams as Catania, an elf who is Amberle's handmaiden. She later becomes the love interest of Ander.
- Emelia Burns as Commander Diana Tilton (season 1), the captain of the Black Watch, the elite unit of the Elven military whose sworn duty is to protect the Ellcrys. She is romantically involved with Arion and was previously in love with Ander.
- Mark Mitchinson as Flick Ohmsford, Wil's uncle and Shea's brother. He is kidnapped by Bandon during the series' second season.
- John Rhys-Davies as Eventine Elessedil (season 1), Amberle's grandfather who has been king of the Elven Kingdom of Arborlon for decades. After the death of his oldest son (Amberle's father), Eventine began grooming his son Arion for the throne. However, in the wake of the demon threat, he decides that the hot-headed Arion is not yet ready to rule.
- Jared Turner (season 1) and Glen Levy (season 2) as Slanter, the Gnome resistance leader who murdered Amberle's father 10 years previously. He reluctantly agrees to help Ander and Tilton find the source of the demons in exchange for his release from prison. Slanter shares his name with a character from The Wishsong of Shannara.
- James Trevena-Brown as Captain Crispin Edensong (season 1), captain of the Home Guard, the personal corps of Elven Hunters beholden to the king or queen of the elves. Charged with protecting Amberle. Captain of the Elven Army.
- Andrew Grainger as Cogline (season 2), a former druid whose mission is to protect Eretria from any threat; he trains her to defend herself against evil forces.
- Desmond Chiam as General Riga (season 2), the leader of the Crimson, who is dedicated to eradicating the use of magic across the Four Lands.
- Erroll Shand as Valcaa (season 2), Riga's right-hand man.
- Kelvin Taylor as Crimson 3, General Riga's third in command.
- Caroline Chikezie as Queen Tamlin (season 2), the formidable leader of the human Kingdom of Leah, and Lyria's estranged mother.

== Episodes ==
=== Series overview ===
Season	Episodes	Originally released		
Season	Episodes	First released	Last released	Network
1	10	January 5, 2016	March 1, 2016	MTV
2	10	October 11, 2017	November 22, 2017	Spike

=== Season 1 (2016) ===
No. overall	No. in season	Title	Directed by	Written by	Original release date	US viewers (millions)
1	1	"Chosen"	Jonathan Liebesman	Alfred Gough & Miles Millar	January 5, 2016	1.03
2	2	"Chosen"	Jonathan Liebesman	Alfred Gough & Miles Millar	January 5, 2016	1.03
Amberle, the Princess of the Elven Kingdom, runs the Gauntlet, customarily an all-male race, to determine who will become the Chosen, seven servants of the Ellcrys, a great tree that holds back an ancient army of demons in a realm called the Forbidding. She finishes seventh. When she touches the tree during the initiation ceremony, she has a vision of elves being slaughtered. The druid Allanon awakens after a long slumber. Wil Ohmsford's mother passes him the elfstones, a magical relic that belonged to Wil's late father. Wil decides to go to Storlock, the village of healers, to learn the healing arts there. On the way, he is ambushed by a troll and saved by a Rover girl named Eretria, who drugs him and steals the elfstones. Allanon meets with the Elven King Eventine in the city of Arborlon and warns him that the Ellcrys is dying. He leaves to seek out Wil and finds him in the treehouse where he had been drugged by Eretria. As the Ellcrys weakens, a demon named the Dagda Mor breaks free of the Forbidding along with the Changeling, whom he dispatches to eliminate the Chosen. Amberle, haunted by the visions she saw when she touched the Ellcrys, flees Arborlon. She comes across Eretria, steals food and a horse, and heads for Wing Hove to meet with her aunt, Eventine's sister Pyria (Sarah Peirse). Meanwhile, Allanon takes Wil to the Druid Keep at Paranor to find the secret to restoring the Ellcrys. Allanon uses magic to uncover a codex, proving to Wil that magic did not end in the War of the Races 300 years ago. The Dagda Mor attacks Allanon in his mind. Allanon and Wil learn that the Chosen are the key to the renewal of the Ellcrys; however, the Changeling, using Amberle's form, has killed them all except Amberle, who had run away. Allanon and Wil track her to Wing Hove, where they are attacked by a Fury summoned from the Forbidding. The Fury kills Pyria and goes after Wil and Amberle.
3	3	"Fury"	James Marshall	Alfred Gough & Miles Millar	January 12, 2016 (Note: The third and fourth episodes were released online on January 5, 2016.)	0.92
As the Fury is chasing Wil and Amberle, an injured Allanon rises and kills it. The trio head to the Druid Cave to treat Allanon. After leaving him there, Wil and Amberle head to Silver River to gather some of its mud, which has healing properties, but are ambushed by Eretria and another rover. They are taken as hostages to the rover camp so Wil can teach Cephelo how to use the Elfstones. Wil is unable to do so, and Cephelo threatens to kill Eretria. A Fury attacks the Rover camp but is destroyed by Wil, using the powers of the elfstones. Allanon is cured by the magic from the Druid Cave and rescues Wil and Amberle from the Rovers. On their way to Arborlon, they find an elf named Bandon chained and left alone and they take him with them. At Arborlon, Bandon has a vision of Amberle dying. The Elven Council discusses the crisis of the Ellcrys and decides to let Amberle, the last of the Chosen, enter the tree and search for its seed, which must be taken to Safehold.
4	4	"Changeling"	James Marshall	Alfred Gough & Miles Millar	January 19, 2016	0.75
Amberle enters the Ellcrys, is put to a test, and gains the seed from the tree when she succeeds. The group prepares to take it to Safehold but realizes that the demon is still alive. Amberle draws an image of a stained glass window, which she saw in a vision inside the Ellcrys. After being threatened by her foster father, Eretria sneaks into the elven palace and seduces Wil only to steal the elfstones again. As she tries to escape the palace, the demon disguises itself as her and attempts to kill Amberle but fails and the real Eretria is arrested for it. Bandon is revealed to be a seer. No one is able to find the demon, so they assume it must be a shapeshifting demon and prepare a trap to catch it. Wil and Eretria realize that the demon was disguised as one of the guards and was aware of the plan. Wil runs to warn Amberle, but the Changeling gets there first and is killed by Allanon, who orders the guards to burn it and save its ashes. However, the demon comes back to life and kills the guards.
5	5	"Reaper"	Brad Turner	Evan Endicott & Josh Stoddard	January 26, 2016	1.03
Ten years earlier, a group of gnomes led by Slanter snuck into Arborlon in an attempt to assassinate the King, but instead killed Prince Aine. In the present, the expedition to find Safehold is ambushed by Cephelo's rovers. Amberle is taken prisoner while Wil and the escort are left to die in the wilderness. Eretria receives her reward—her own freedom—and leaves the group, but comes back to free Amberle, take Cephelo prisoner and save Wil and most of the guards. Once the group arrives at their destination, the Reaper, a demon hungry for death, has already killed the garrison and attacks them. Cephelo lures it into an ancient field of chemical garbage and sets the field on fire, killing it. Meanwhile, Allanon asks Bandon to contact Amberle through the Ellcrys. In a vision, he sees her dead at Dagda Mor's feet. News comes in about demon attacks on elven villages. Ander suggests they seek the demon's source and enlists Slanter, who was captured and imprisoned 10 years earlier, as a guide. The Changeling, disguised as Arion, kills the King and takes his place.
6	6	"Pykon"	Brad Turner	Zander Lehmann	February 2, 2016	0.97
While camping, Amberle has a romantic dream about Wil. As a snow storm comes their way, the group decides to take a shortcut to Wilderun by passing through Pykon, a snowy Elven outpost. As they get there, they are welcomed by Mag, a mysterious child, and Remo, an elf who is the property's caretaker. Elsewhere, Reaper rises from the ashes of the explosion and follows the group's tracks. Remo reveals himself to be a torturer seeking revenge. As he begins to torture Amberle, Wil is able to stop him with the help of Mag. The group tries to escape Pykon when the Reaper reaches them. Crispin is killed while fighting it. Wil, Amberle and Eretria fall off a cliff with the Reaper. In Arborlon, the Changeling, disguised as the King, convinces Arion to find an ancient sword said to possess power to defeat Dagda Mor. Once Arion succeeds, he is confronted by Allanon who reveals that the weapon is a talisman of evil and a danger to all. Arion then stabs Allanon, removing him from existence. Meanwhile, Ander and Slanter find Dagda Mor's horde of demons.
7	7	"Breakline"	Jesse Warn	Deanna Kizis	February 9, 2016	0.80
After Wil, Eretria, and Amberle fall off the cliff, they get separated. After awakening next to the Reaper's corpse and prying the Elfstones out of his bloody left palm, Wil is attacked by a male elf from Owen Moor named Perk, whose left ear was stolen by Elf Hunters who cut off and sell the ears to gnomes. He wants to rescue his female partner Genewen who was captured by them. The man who cut off his ear, Cormac, is left behind to guard the camp as their female leader Zora pursues the princess. Eretria and Amberle are subsequently chased by the same group into an old hall that sunk underground during the great war. Meanwhile, in Arborlon, the Changeling, in the guise of King Eventine, sends the Princes Ander and Arion on a seemingly futile mission to kill the Dagda Mor. Allanon is healed by his former master Bremen and returns to Earth. While underground Amberle picks up three blue dice; an eight-sided and a pair of ten-sided dice. They also notice a map which resembles Eretria's vision and she tells Eretria it is Safehold. She and Eretria fight off some Elf Hunters but are captured by Zora. Wil arrives, dangling from Genewen, who turns out to be a flying Roc mounted by Perk, who is a Wing Rider. On the way out Zora shoots Eretria and she falls. More of the Elf Hunters arrive, preventing them from going back for her. The princes arrive to face the Dagda Mor, discovering an imprisoned Bandon. Arion attacks the evil Druid with the sword, but the Dagda Mor is prepared and kills him. Allanon arrives on the scene just in time to save Ander and free Bandon. Eretria is shown hauled off alongside a golf bag full of clubs and a white plastic lawn chair. Ander kills the Changeling with Allanon's collapsible sword, becoming King of the Elves.
8	8	"Utopia"	Jesse Warn	April Blair	February 16, 2016	0.78
Allanon tells Bandon he will train him to be the next druid. Ander gets drunk. Eretria is bought out of slavery (along with the map to Safehold) by a human, who shows her how to shoot a revolver and they watch James T. Kirk and Spock in a scene from Star Trek: The Motion Picture. After kissing, Wil and Amberle rescue Cephelo but he ditches them before they sneak into the human village Eretria is in, hugging Wil as he leaves. Cephelo is captured skulking around the village border after noticing that Zora is laying dead outside. Eretria reveals to Wil that the Safehold map is in the village, he seems surprised, indicating Amberle had not told him this. When Wil and Amberle's elven heritage is uncovered during the party, Eretria sneaks off and speaks to a man with a mutilated eye. After he warns her, she flirts with her new owner long enough to steal his revolver. The three are tied to posts to be sacrificed to trolls, Cephelo offers their captors a bag which he says contain the Elfstones. When opened, it is actually the three blue dice that Amberle found. Eretria frees the captives after shooting a troll about to kill Wil. Firefight ensues and Cephelo is mortally wounded. He takes Eretria's pistol and buys them time to escape. More trolls arrive and finding their dead friend attack the Utopians. Episode ends with Wil, Amberle and Eretria coming out of a forest to look upon the ruins of San Francisco.
9	9	"Safehold"	Brad Turner	Evan Endicott & Josh Stoddard	February 23, 2016	0.72
Wil, Amberle, and Eretria arrive at Safehold, which turns out to be the ruins of San Francisco and Oakland (the name Safehold coming off the highway sign missing some letters). Eretria discovers that the tattoo on her back is a magical map to the location of the Bloodfire and leads the group there. They are confronted by the Guardians of the Bloodfire who attempt to turn the group against each other. Ander sends Commander Tilton to make an alliance with the Gnomes against the Demons. The Dagda Mor continues to control Bandon's mind, forcing him to attack Ander, Catania, and finally Allanon, who subdues him. Elven Councilor Kael Pindanon, thinking Ander too weak to lead, attempts to seize the throne for herself and has Ander imprisoned. Commander Tilton and Slanter return to Arborlon with a Gnome army and free Ander, and the Council accepts Ander as king after he announces the alliance with the Gnomes. Overcoming the Guardians' mental assaults, Eretria discovers her blood is the key to unlocking the Bloodfire and impales her hand on a magical spike, causing the Bloodfire to ignite. Wil destroys the Guardians with the Elfstones, and Amberle immerses herself in the Bloodfire. When it vanishes, Amberle is nowhere to be seen, and Eretria is unconscious. The last leaf falls from the Ellcrys, and the Elves and Gnomes prepare for war as the Dagda Mor's Demon army marches on Arborlon.
10	10	"Ellcrys"	Brad Turner	April Blair & Evan Endicott & Josh Stoddard	March 1, 2016	0.85
Wil revives Eretria with the Elfstones. Within the magic of the Bloodfire, Amberle learns the nature of her quest from the spirit of the Ellcrys before returning to join Wil and Eretria. While leaving Safehold, the group is pursued by Trolls, and Eretria stays behind to give the others time to escape. After returning to Arborlon, Wil and Amberle profess their love for each other. Bandon escapes from prison with Catania's help. The Demon army attacks Arborlon, and the Elves and Gnomes fight to defend the Ellcrys. In the battle, Ander and Commander Tilton encounter Arion, now resurrected as a Demon. Arion kills Commander Tilton before being killed himself by Ander. Allanon and Slanter rescue Wil and Amberle from a group of Demons and escort them to the Ellcrys. The Dagda Mor blocks their way, and Allanon battles the evil Druid. Amberle tells Wil that she is the seed and must sacrifice herself to become the new Ellcrys. The Dagda Mor knocks Allanon aside and tries to kill Wil and Amberle. Wil holds off the Demon leader with the Elfstones and Allanon beheads him. Amberle successfully becomes the new Ellcrys, and the Forbidding is renewed, banishing the Demons. Allanon admits to a heartbroken Wil that he knew what Amberle had to do from the beginning and reminds him that all magic comes with a price. Wil rides off to Safehold to rescue Eretria. Bandon is briefly seen carrying the Dagda Mor's evil blade, his eyes turned completely black. Eretria is captured by Trolls and recognizes one of her captors.

=== Season 2 (2017) ===
No. overall	No. in season	Title	Directed by	Written by	Original release date	US viewers (millions)
11	1	"Druid"	Brad Turner	Alfred Gough & Miles Millar	October 11, 2017	0.31
Eretria is living in the ruins of San Francisco, scavenging Old World technology for Cogline with her girlfriend, Lyria, and wondering why Wil and Amberle have not come looking for her. Wil is working in Storlock, training to become a Healer, when the mysterious Mareth arrives, seeking treatment for a burned hand. Meanwhile, Ander Elessedil is struggling to help the Elves rebuild their lives after the battle against the Dagda Mor and his Demons. Bandon has taken refuge in Skull Mountain, where he plans to resurrect the Warlock Lord. Allanon endeavors to stop him. Riga goes hunting for Wil in Shady Vale.
12	2	"Wraith"	Brad Turner	Evan Endicott & Josh Stoddard	October 18, 2017	0.21
After learning that Mareth is the daughter of Allanon, Wil and Mareth search for answers. Meanwhile, Eretria and Lyria are taken captive by a group of Rovers only to be rescued by the bounty hunter Garet Jax. Jax reveals that he has been sent by Lyria's mother Queen Tamlin of Leah, the only human kingdom in the Four Lands. King Ander Elessedil seeks an alliance with Queen Tamlin, who demands that Ander marry Lyria in order to seal the alliance. Bandon learns that Wil's uncle Flick lives in Shady Vale. Following a confrontation with Wil, Bandon kidnaps Flick and tells him he has three days to bring Allanon to Paranor if he wants his uncle back alive. Meanwhile, Allanon is kidnapped by members of the Crimson. Ander's lover Catania is also murdered by Edain, an undercover Crimson agent.
13	3	"Graymark"	James Marshall	Javier Grillo-Marxuach	October 25, 2017	0.23
In Graymark, Allanon is brought before the magic-hating General Riga, leader of the Crimson. Determined to destroy magic, Riga demands that Allanon yield the Codex of Paranor and tortures him. After reuniting with Eretria, Wil teams up with Mareth and Garet Jax to rescue Allanon from Graymark. Posing as Jax's prisoner, Wil infiltrates Graymark only to be trapped by Riga. Seeking the Codex, Riga drains Wil's blood. Allanon and Wil are rescued by Eretria, Mareth, and Jax who escape following a skirmish with the Crimson. Trying to cover up Catania's death, Edain tells Ander that she left Leah. Queen Tamlin orders Edain to contact the Crimson, exposing herself as their financier.
14	4	"Dweller"	James Marshall	Elle Triedman	November 1, 2017	0.16
Bandon reminds Queen Tamlin of the deal she had forged with the Warlock Lord. Meanwhile, Mareth has a tense reunion with her Druid father Allanon. Bandon takes Flick to the former farm house where he was imprisoned. Consumed by hatred of the prejudice of non-magical folk towards magic users, Bandon brutally kills the new Elven occupants' son. Back in Leah, Eretria and Lyria reconcile and accepts Lyria's arranged marriage pact with Ander. Suspecting that Edain murdered Catania, Ander along with Garet, Eretria, and Slanter capture Edain and his men smuggling weapons to the Crimson. Edain confesses to his crime and is executed by Ander. Meanwhile, Allanon travels with Wil and Mareth to the Wolfsktaag Mountains to obtain the Sword of Shannara, which they obtain following a battle with a giant spider-like Dweller.
15	5	"Paranor"	Toa Fraser	Evan Endicott & Josh Stoddard	November 8, 2017	0.24
Wil, Allanon, and Mareth managed to trap Bandon inside Paranor. However, Bandon had poisoned Flick as an insurance and has the only cure that will save him from certain death. Ignoring Allanon and Flick's pleas not to heed Bandon, they decide to retrieve the Warlock Lord's skull. This quest takes them back in time to Shady Vale where the two encounter Wil's father Shea Ohmsford and mother Heady. Wil and Mareth struggle to save his parents' relationship while facing a demon. Meanwhile, Eretria learns from Cogline that she is a descendant of Armageddon's Children, a sect of human–demon hybrids who had the potential to be corrupted by dark forces. Under Cogline's tutelage, Eretria begins learning how to resist the darkness. Garet Jax is tracked down by Valcaa and several Crimson warriors but turns the tables on his attackers. To punish Valcaa for murdering the son of one of his former Border Legion comrades, Jax along with Ander and Lyria brutally interrogate him.
16	6	"Crimson"	Brad Turner	April Blair	November 8, 2017	0.27
In the past, Wil and Mareth find the Warlock Lord's skull under Shea and Heady's scarecrow. Wil reveals his identity to Shea and saves his father from being killed by Mord Wraiths; making peace with his father. Returning to the present, Wil releases Bandon from Paranor but refuses to hand the Warlock Lord's skull until Bandon heals his uncle Flick. Flick kills himself with the Warlock Sword. Following a fight, Bandon escapes with the skull, leaving behind a wounded Allanon. Meanwhile, Garet Jax kills an escaped Valcaa. In Leah, the wedding of King Ander and Princess Lyria is gatecrashed by General Riga and the Crimson, who attack the guests. Despite the arrival of Jax and Eretria, King Ander is slain by General Riga.
17	7	"Warlock"	James Marshall	Alex Díaz & Julie Díaz	November 15, 2017	0.27
Eretria and Lyria flee Leah and hide in Cogline's lair. Eretria receives a vision from Amberle warning of a coming darkness and that Wil is their last hope and needs to reach the Ellcrys. Meanwhile, Mareth and Wil bring the wounded Allanon to Storlock. Mareth uses a magic ritual to enter Allanon's dreams and finds her father. The Druid Bremen tells them that Mareth is the next Druid. After awakening, the healed Allanon agrees to train Mareth as his successor. Eretria and Wil then travel to the Ellcrys together. Meanwhile, Bandon kills the garrison at Graymark and uses a magic ritual during an eclipse to resurrect the Warlock Lord. Back in Leah, General Riga sentences the deposed Queen Tamlin to death. Recognizing how her actions contributed to the predicament, Tamlin gracefully accepts her fate and throws herself over the waterfall.
18	8	"Amberle"	James Marshall	April Blair and Elle Triedman	November 15, 2017	0.28
Wil and Eretria arrived at Arborlon only to discover the Crimson have attacked. While Eretria searches for the Chosen, Wil enters the Ellcrys and meets with Amberle. Following a tense reunion, Wil reconciles with his former lover and decides to put the past behind him. Wil encounters his father Shea who tells him that the Warlock Lord can only be slain by the Sword of Shannara. After abandoning his feelings for Amberle, Wil finds that the sword has regrown. At Graymark, the Warlock Lord torments Bandon by resurrecting his lover Catania and forcing him to kill her. While bonding at Storlock, Allanon and Mareth are captured by General Riga and the Crimson, who seizes the Codex. The two are sentenced to burn at the stake. General Riga later returns to Graymark only to be killed by the Warlock Lord, who takes the Codex. Back at Arborlon, Eretria is possessed by a Mord Wraith in the service of the Warlock Lord.
19	9	"Wilderun"	Toa Fraser	Matt Lambert	November 22, 2017	0.26
At Storlock, Allanon and Mareth are rescued by the newly-freed Garet Jax and the Gnomes. Together, they set off for Graymark only to discover that the Warlock Lord has left with the Codex. They find a dead Bandon and General Riga's head. Using Riga's head, Jax and the Gnomes managed to convince the surviving Crimson soldiers at Leah to join forces and fight against the Warlock Lord. Meanwhile, Eretria reveals her past to Wil. Eretria, Wil, Allanon, and Mareth reunite with Lyria and Cogline in the Enclave. However, the Warlock Lord and his Mord Wraith discovers their location using Eretria's demonic connection. The Warlock Lord bests Allanon, Cogline, and Mareth in combat while the possessed Eretria steals Lyria's golden elfstone necklace; the key to unlocking Heaven's Well.
20	10	"Blood"	Brad Turner	Evan Endicott & Josh Stoddard	November 22, 2017	0.24
The Warlock Lord kills Allanon in combat. Along with the possessed Eretria and the captive Lyria, they travel to Leah to infect Heaven’s Well. Garet Jax commands the combined defense of Leah. After unlocking Heaven’s Well, the Warlock Lord infects the dam and rivers with the dark magic in his blood. The possessed Eretria sabotages the dam but is exorcised by Cogline and Jax. Wil and Mareth fight the Warlock Lord with Wil sacrificing his life to kill the Warlock and heal the infected river. With the Warlock Lord’s defeat, Lyria is crowned Queen. Eretria, Mareth and Cogline travel to Paranor, where Mareth senses that Wil is still alive. Wil awakens in a battlefield surrounded by Furies.

== Production ==
=== Conception and development ===
Sonar Entertainment and Farah Films acquired the TV rights to the Shannara universe in 2012. In December 2013, it was announced that a series based on the books was being produced for MTV and had been given a straight-to-series, 10-episode order. On April 20, 2016, MTV greenlit a second season of The Shannara Chronicles.

The series was produced by Dan Farah, Jon Favreau, Miles Millar, Al Gough, Jonathan Liebesman, and author Terry Brooks. Brooks has stated in an interview that he is happy with the way his story has been adapted. Much like the television adaptation of A Song of Ice and Fire, the series was not a direct adaptation following the narrative order of the books, but featured a mix of the books' stories. The first book of the series to be adapted is The Elfstones of Shannara, the second book in the trilogy, with some elements of the other novels being gradually adapted to the show.

=== Casting ===
In December 2014, it was announced that Manu Bennett would star as Allanon and in January 2015 Ivana Baquero, Austin Butler, Poppy Drayton, Emelia Burns and John Rhys-Davies joined the show. Malese Jow, Vanessa Morgan, Gentry White, Desmond Chiam and Caroline Chikezie joined the cast as series regulars in season two.

=== Filming ===
Filming for the 10-episode first season wrapped in New Zealand at Auckland Film Studios in June 2015, and the first trailer debuted on July 10, 2015. Filming for the second season, which also consists of 10 episodes, began January 31, 2017, in New Zealand.

=== Music ===
The opening theme song, "Until We Go Down", from the EP "Up in Flames", is performed by Ruelle. Other songs featured in the show's first season include "Midnight" by Coldplay, "You Are a Memory" by Message to Bears, "Wave" by Beck and "Run Boy Run" by Woodkid.

== Release ==
During The Shannara Chronicles panel at San Diego Comic-Con in July 2015, a teaser trailer was revealed, giving audiences a first look at the sets and characters. A television version of the trailer was shown during the 2015 MTV Video Music Awards.

=== Broadcast ===
The Shannara Chronicles premiered on MTV in the United States on January 5, 2016, with a two-hour series premiere. New episodes were broadcast every Tuesday at 10 pm ET. The third and fourth episodes were released online after the first two episodes aired on January 5, 2016, prior to their original broadcast schedule.

The series was simulcast on MTV in Canada. The two-hour pilot also aired on Bell Media sister network CTV on Wednesday, January 6, 2016. The series has also been licensed to a number of different countries, including the United Kingdom (airing on 5STAR), Australia (Syfy) and New Zealand (Sky TV).

=== Cancellation ===
On January 16, 2018, it was announced that the series had been cancelled after two seasons. Producers later announced that the series is being shopped to other networks. The series was later considered officially concluded.

== Reception ==
=== Critical response ===
The Shannara Chronicles has received mixed reviews, receiving a 52/100 score on Metacritic, based on 15 reviews and a 54% for season 1 on Rotten Tomatoes based on 26 reviews, with an average rating of 5.2/10. The site's critical consensus reads: "The Shannara Chronicles wears its influences heavily on its sleeve and needs to find surer footing before it can tap its true potential, but it still might suffice for viewers in search of a teen-friendly Game of Thrones." The second season received a 100% approval rating based on five reviews.

Neil Genzlinger of The New York Times wrote: "So give this reasonably absorbing series a little credit, even though it often seems to be merely reworking various fantasy formulas. It moves quickly and does a nice job of weaving together two story lines involving an elfin world that is threatened when a giant tree, known as the Ellcrys, begins to die." Maureen Ryan of Variety wrote: "Sure, Shannara, which harks back to the golden age of syndicated genre fare, is a standard quest journey in which there are trolls, gnomes, living trees and magic books, and characters say things like, 'If Allanon is here, there are dark days ahead.' But there's conviction in the show's execution."

=== Ratings ===
==== Season 1 (2016) ====
Viewership and ratings per episode of The Shannara Chronicles
No.	Title	Air date	Rating (18–49)	Viewers (millions)	DVR (18–49)	DVR viewers (millions)	Total (18–49)	Total viewers (millions)
1–2	"Chosen"	January 5, 2016	0.5	1.03	—N/a	—N/a	—N/a	—N/a
3	"Fury"	January 12, 2016	0.4	0.92	0.3	0.75	0.7	1.67
4	"Changeling"	January 19, 2016	0.3	0.75	0.3	—N/a	0.6	—N/a
5	"Reaper"	January 26, 2016	0.5	1.03	—N/a	—N/a	—N/a	—N/a
6	"Pykon"	February 2, 2016	0.4	0.97	0.5	1.11	0.9	2.08
7	"Breakline"	February 9, 2016	0.3	0.80	0.5	0.99	0.8	1.79
8	"Utopia"	February 16, 2016	0.3	0.78	0.5	0.93	0.8	1.71
9	"Safehold"	February 23, 2016	0.3	0.72	0.4	0.86	0.7	1.58
10	"Ellcrys"	March 1, 2016	0.4	0.85	0.4	0.92	0.8	1.77

==== Season 2 (2017) ====
Viewership and ratings per episode of The Shannara Chronicles
No.	Title	Air date	Rating (18–49)	Viewers (millions)	DVR (18–49)	DVR viewers (millions)	Total (18–49)	Total viewers (millions)
1	"Druid"	October 11, 2017	0.1	0.31	0.2	0.42	0.3	0.73
2	"Wraith"	October 18, 2017	0.1	0.21	—N/a	0.36	—N/a	0.57
3	"Graymark"	October 25, 2017	0.1	0.23	0.2	0.36	0.3	0.58
4	"Dweller"	November 1, 2017	0.1	0.16	—N/a	0.34	—N/a	0.50
5	"Paranor"	November 8, 2017	0.1	0.24	—N/a	—N/a	—N/a	—N/a
6	"Crimson"	November 8, 2017	0.1	0.27	—N/a	—N/a	—N/a	—N/a
7	"Warlock"	November 15, 2017	0.1	0.27	—N/a	—N/a	—N/a	—N/a
8	"Amberle"	November 15, 2017	0.1	0.28	—N/a	—N/a	—N/a	—N/a
9	"Wilderun"	November 22, 2017	0.1	0.26	—N/a	0.35	—N/a	0.61
10	"Blood"	November 22, 2017	0.1	0.24	—N/a	0.31	—N/a	0.55

=== Accolades ===
The series was nominated for a Saturn Award for "Best Fantasy TV Series" for the 2015–2016 season.
