= Elfstone =

Elfstone can refer to:

== Novel ==
- The Elfstones of Shannara - an epic fantasy novel from the Shannara series of novels by Terry Brooks.

== Objects ==
- Elfstones - in the Shannara series by Terry Brooks, "elfstones" are magical stones from the Age of Faerie that hold great power.
- Elfstone - in J. R. R. Tolkien's fantasy writings, the Elfstone is a famous green jewel that Galadriel gives as a gift to Aragorn; it is also known as the "Elessar" or the "Stone of Eärendil".
