= Made Men (film) =

- Directed by: Louis Morneau
- Written by: Robert Franke; Alfred Gough; Miles Millar
- Produced by: Richard Donner; Joel Silver
- Starring: James Belushi; Michael Beach; Timothy Dalton; Steve Railsback; Carlton Wilborn; Vanessa Angel; Jamie Harris; David O'Donnell
- Cinematography: George Mooradian
- Edited by: Glenn Garland
- Music by: Stewart Copeland
- Production company: Decade Pictures
- Distributed by: HBO
- Release dates: June 11, 1999 (United States); August 4, 1999 (United Kingdom)
- Running time: 91 minutes
- Country: United States
- Language: English
- Budget: $6 million (est)

Made Men is a 1999 film directed by Louis Morneau and produced by HBO starring James Belushi, Michael Beach and Timothy Dalton. It combines elements of comedy with action, crime and adventure.

== Cast ==
- James Belushi as Bill Manucci
- Michael Beach as Miles
- Timothy Dalton as Sheriff Dex Drier
- Steve Railsback as Kyle
- Carlton Wilborn as Felix
- Vanessa Angel as Debra
- Jamie Harris as Royce
- David O'Donnell as Nick
- Tim Kelleher as Deputy Conley
- Don Shanks as Caleb
- Conrad Goode as Jessop

== Production ==
Made men was filmed on location in Utah.

== Reception ==
The film has been described as "an explosive, intense and delirious action movie". On the review aggregator website Rotten Tomatoes, 20% of 5 critics' reviews are positive.
