= Aquaman (TV pilot) =

American superhero television pilot

- Genre: Drama; Action; Superhero
- Based on: DC Comics characters
- Written by: Alfred Gough; Miles Millar
- Directed by: Greg Beeman
- Starring: Justin Hartley; Lou Diamond Phillips; Denise Quiñones; Rick Peters; Amber McDonald; Ving Rhames
- Music by: Didier Rachou
- Country of origin: United States
- Original language: English

Production
- Executive producers: Greg Beeman; Alfred Gough; Miles Millar
- Producer: Terry Miller
- Cinematography: Christopher Faloona
- Editor: Andi Armaganian
- Running time: 42 minutes
- Production companies: Miller/Gough Ink; DC Comics; Warner Bros. Television

Original release
- Network: iTunes
- Release: July 24, 2006

Related
- Smallville

Aquaman is an American superhero unsold television pilot developed by Smallville creators Alfred Gough and Miles Millar for The WB Television Network, based on the DC Comics character of the same name. The pilot show was produced by Millar Gough Ink, DC Comics, and Warner Bros. Television Studios. Gough and Millar wrote the pilot, which was directed by Greg Beeman. Justin Hartley starred as Arthur "A.C." Curry, a young man living in a beachside community in the Florida Keys who learns about his powers and destiny as the Prince of Atlantis.

The Aquaman pilot was expected to debut in the fall schedule of 2006, but following the merger of the WB and UPN, the resulting CW Network opted not to buy the series. After they passed on the pilot, it was made available online through iTunes in the United States on July 24, 2006, and became the number-one most downloaded television show on iTunes. It received generally favorable reviews, was later released on other online markets, and aired on Canada's YTV.

== Pilot summary ==
Arthur and his mother, Atlanna, are flying over the Bermuda Triangle. As they get closer, Atlanna's necklace begins to glow and a surge of light and energy erupts from the ocean, causing cyclones which bring their plane down. Atlanna is kidnapped by a siren, but not before giving Arthur her necklace and calling him Orin.

Ten years later, Arthur is charged with releasing dolphins from a marine park. His father bails him out of trouble but gives him a stern lecture on responsibility. Later, Arthur tells his friend Eva that he felt like the dolphins were calling to him. While he's working, he is approached by a lighthouse keeper who identifies himself as McCaffery. The Coast Guard picks up an unidentified man floating in the Bermuda Triangle and pleads to warn Orin. Lt. Torres is sent to investigate the area. Arthur is also at the Triangle, and his necklace triggers another surge of light, which causes Torres to crash her jet, though he manages to rescue her. Federal Agent Brigman transports John Doe to another facility and persuades Torres to join his team. Brigman is looking for a connection between the disappearances of thousands of individuals and their reappearance years later without ever aging a day.

That evening, Arthur meets a seductive young woman named Nadia, who convinces him to go swimming naked with her. In the water, Nadia reveals herself to be not only a Siren, but the one who took his mother. Arthur barely escapes with a little help from McCaffery. McCaffery explains that he, Arthur, and Arthur's mother were all exiled from Atlantis, and that Arthur is the prince of Atlantis. Arthur convinces Eva to leave Tempest Key for a few days, but it comes too late as Nadia injures Eva and captures Arthur. When he wakes up, Arthur finds that Nadia has also captured McCaffery, and she is bringing them both back to Atlantis to be executed. Breaking free using a flask of water to enhance his strength, Arthur destroys Nadia by putting a spear through her head. The next morning, McCaffery explains that there will be more creatures that will come looking for Arthur and that he should have started his training years prior. Arthur agrees to start his training, and McCaffery leaves him with Henry IV Part 1 and Part 2 to read. McCaffery informs Arthur, who would rather just skip to the ending, that "it isn't about the ending, it's about the journey".

== Cast and characters ==
- Justin Hartley as Arthur "A.C." Curry / Orin / Aquaman: The central character of the show, he runs a dive shop in his day-to-day life. Arthur is aware of his special abilities, but uses them for fun before learning in the pilot episode of his destiny as the lost Prince of Atlantis.
- Lou Diamond Phillips as Tom Curry: A Coast Guard officer. While in his rookie year, he rescues the infant Arthur (then named Orin), Atlanna, and McCaffery from shark-infested waters. He later falls in love with Atlanna, marries her, and adopts her son.
- Denise Quiñones as Lt. Rachel Torres: A fighter pilot, she meets Arthur when he rescues her after her jet crashes in the ocean. She is then asked by Brigman to aid in his investigation.
- Rick Peters as Agent Brigman: A U.S. agent who has been investigating the apparent resurfacing of people around Mercy Reef who were lost in the Bermuda Triangle, some, as much as 40 years ago.
- Ving Rhames as McCaffery: A lighthouse keeper and Arthur's mentor. He is also an Atlantean.
- Amber McDonald as Eva: Arthur's business partner, they together run a dive shop in Tempest Keys and are close friends.
- Adrianne Palicki as Nadia: A siren and the villain of the story, she is the one responsible for the disappearance of Atlanna.
- Daniella Wolters as Atlanna: Arthur's mother, she was taken from him when he was young, and her disappearance has mystified Arthur ever since. She was the first to call him "Orin".

== Production ==
=== Development ===
The concept of Aquaman stemmed from a fifth season episode of Smallville, "Aqua". The episode featured Arthur Curry (portrayed by Alan Ritchson) coming to Smallville to stop an underwater weapons project being developed by LuthorCorp. "Aqua" became the highest rated episode for Smallville that season, but was never meant to be a backdoor pilot for an Aquaman series. However, as work progressed on "Aqua", the character was recognized to have potential for his own series. Alfred Gough and Miles Millar, the creators of Smallville, also considered a series featuring Lois Lane, but felt more confident about Aquaman. Millar said that they envisioned Aquaman as a franchise with 100 episodes.

Alan Ritchson was not considered for the role in the new series because Gough and Millar did not consider it a spin-off from Smallville. Gough said in November 2005 that the series was going to be a different version of the 'Aquaman' legend, but did express the idea of a crossover with Smallville at some point. There was initial speculation that the show's title would not be Aquaman. Tempest Keys and Mercy Reef were rumored to be the working titles for the series. The show would eventually be listed as Aquaman, when it was later released on iTunes. Greg Beeman, who has produced and directed episodes of Smallville, was hired to direct the pilot.

=== Writing ===
"It was at the point where he was beyond discovering his powers; he was breathing underwater. The interesting thing about it was, he didn't keep it a secret. He kind of used it to get laid and stuff".

— Justin Hartley on A.C.'s abilities

Justin Hartley explained that Arthur would be aware of his powers at the beginning of the series and would have no problem using them for personal gain. Hartley felt this played against the typical superheroes, because his character was not afraid to flaunt his abilities. Gough explained that A.C. would be able to swim faster than humans, breathe underwater, as well as have super strength while underwater. He also stated that exposure to water on land would give him powers. The extent of his speed is shown in the pilot, when Arthur can keep up with a fighter jet flying above him. The extent of A.C.'s ability to breathe underwater was not elaborated upon, but he is seen swimming near the bottom of the ocean near the start of the pilot. When A.C. is talking to Eva about releasing captive dolphins, he tells her that he felt as though the dolphins were somehow calling to him. In the comics, one of Aquaman's powers is the ability to communicate with sea life. Gough likened A.C.'s not having access to water to Clark Kent's growing weakness around kryptonite in Smallville – if A.C. does not get water, he will dehydrate and weaken. Water gives him a power boost and enables writers to explore stories on land.

Ideas for future episodes focused on environmental threats, such as "ocean polluters" and "evil oil companies". Thirteen episodes were fully planned out, with a possible story arc involving McCaffery being captured and taken back to Atlantis. Stories regarding mythology were set to play a small role in later episodes. Gough and Millar chose to go with a more classic version of the Aquaman mythology, pulling largely from the comics. Gough said that "unlike Superman, there really isn't a set core mythology for Arthur Curry. There are a couple different versions of it. We went with the most classic one".

=== Casting ===
The role of Arthur Curry was originally given to Will Toale, after Gough and Millar saw over 400 candidates from England, Australia, Canada and the United States. Before filming began, Toale was replaced with Justin Hartley. A CW spokesman said: "We have made the decision to go in a different direction with the Aquaman role and wish [Toale] the best of luck in all of his endeavors". Graham Bentz was cast as a young Arthur Curry, while Adrianne Palicki was cast as a Siren named Nadia. Ving Rhames, Amber McDonald, Denise Quiñones, Rick Peters, and Lou Diamond Phillips filled in the rest of the regular cast members.

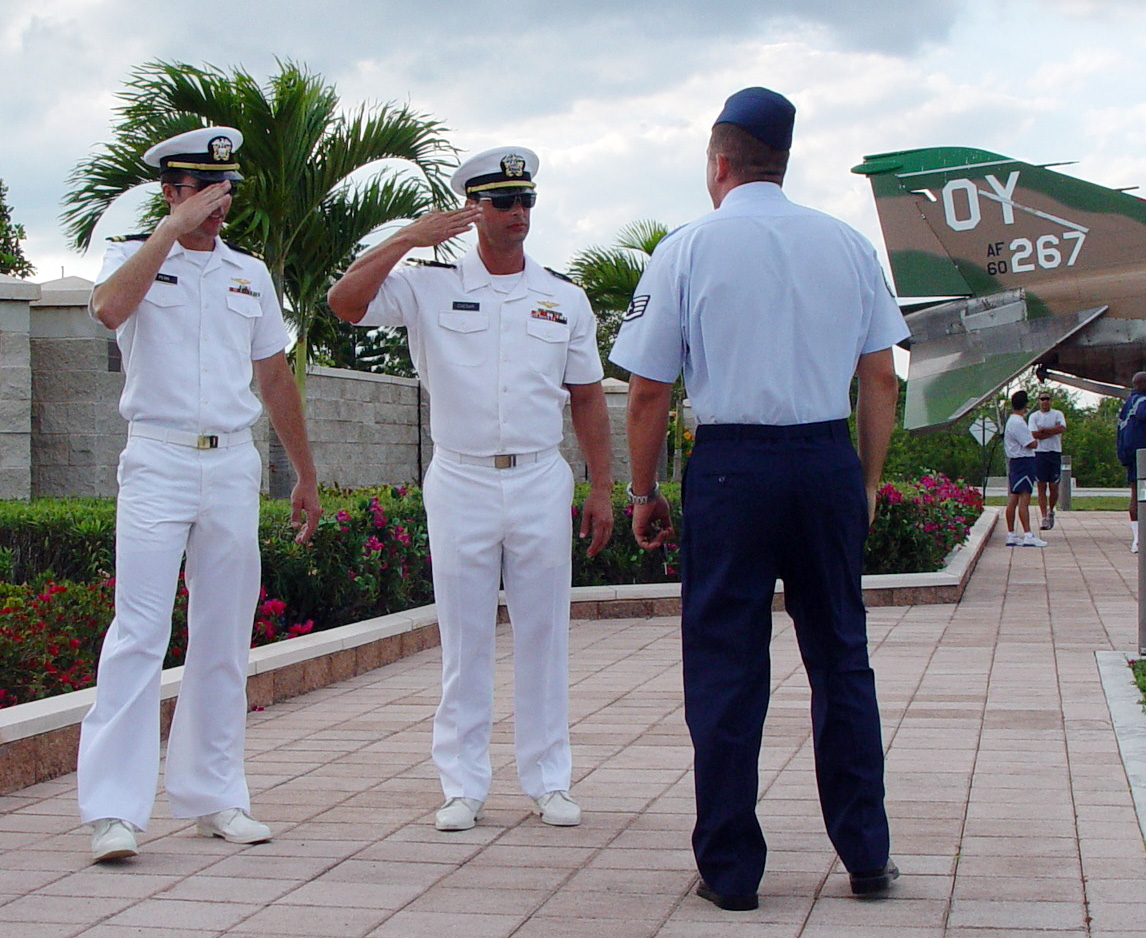
Staff Sergeant Leo Castellano teaches two actors how to salute.

Four of the cast members guest-starred on Smallville before the Aquaman pilot. Denise Quiñones played Andrea Rojas in the season five episode "Vengeance," while Adrianne Palicki appeared in the season three episode "Covenant". Rick Peters was cast as Bob Rickman in the season one episode "Hug". Kenny Johnson, who briefly appears as the Sheriff in the pilot's opening, guest starred in the season five episode "Mortal".

=== Filming ===
Production was based in North Miami, Florida; filming began in March 2006 with an estimated budget of $7 million. Practical and exterior footage was shot around Coconut Grove, Miami. Some scenes were filmed on location at the Homestead Air Reserve Base adjacent to Homestead, Florida. The 482nd Fighter Wing Airmen were used as extras while filming at the base, along with several of their fighter aircraft. The production was expected to continue in June of that year, had it been given the greenlight.

Some of the actors received training from Staff Sergeant Leo Castellano on the proper way to present arms. Much of the filming took place underwater; Hartley filmed his underwater scenes without a tank, breathing from the safety divers' tanks around him for the scenes out on the ocean. Hartley had never been scuba diving and was not a diver, but did say that he was a good swimmer. Entity FX, the firm which did the special effects for Smallville since its second season, was contracted to work on the Aquaman pilot.

== Release ==
The pilot was considered to have a good chance of being picked up, but ultimately, the CW passed on the show. Discussing the excitement surrounding the project, Lou Diamond Phillips said: "The funny thing about the Aquaman project is that there's so much buzz about it already. Which is amazing, I mean you don't usually get that with a pilot, because they're sort of sight unseen". There were reports of two WB pilots in contention for the new CW network, one being Aquaman, which was a frontrunner. When The CW announced its fall lineup in May 2006, Aquaman was not on the list. Dawn Ostroff, The CW's president of entertainment, stated that it was still a midseason contender.

Gough and Miller were so passionate about the pilot that they wanted it released in some form so the fans could see it. Gough said in an interview: "The implication when a network doesn't pick up a show is that the pilot sucks, and that's not the case. It's not a perfect pilot by any stretch of the imagination. There are other reasons—which are a mystery to us—as to why The CW didn't pick it up". He mentioned a potential release as an extended episode during the sixth season of Smallville.

The pilot became one of the first shows offered by Warner Brothers on the iTunes Store (available only to US customers) for $1.99, under the title Aquaman on July 25, 2006. Within a week, it reached the number-one spot on the list of most downloaded TV shows on the digital store's list, and it held that spot for over a week. Gough said: "At least the pilot is now getting its day in court with the fans, and the reviews have all been very positive". It became the first show available on iTunes which had not previously aired on a network. The pilot was released the week of March 12, 2007 on the Xbox Live Video Marketplace. By March 24, the pilot reached #6 on the Video Marketplace's top downloads. Canadian television network YTV aired the pilot as part of their "Superhero Saturday" on June 9 the same year. Warner Home Video in association with Best Buy released the pilot as a promotional DVD on November 11, bundling it together with selected Smallville season sets. Warner Bros. attached it as a bonus feature to the Blu-ray release of Justice League: Crisis on Two Earths in February 2009.

Critical response was generally positive. The pilot was found comparable in quality to Smallville, with suggestions that Aquaman was indeed worthy of a place on The CW's schedule. The cast was well received; in addition, Hartley was praised for his portrayal of Arthur Curry. Cinematography and underwater special effects were well received. The project was commended for keeping the comic book myth fresh and exciting for a modern audience.

== See also ==
- Smallville – American superhero television series (2001–2011)
- List of television series canceled before airing an episode
