= Beetlejuice Beetlejuice =

2024 film by Tim Burton

- Theatrical release poster
- Directed by: Tim Burton
- Screenplay by: Alfred Gough; Miles Millar
- Story by: Alfred Gough; Miles Millar; Seth Grahame-Smith
- Based on: Characters by: Michael McDowell; Larry Wilson
- Produced by: Marc Toberoff; Dede Gardner; Jeremy Kleiner; Tommy Harper; Tim Burton
- Starring: Michael Keaton; Winona Ryder; Catherine O'Hara; Justin Theroux; Monica Bellucci; Jenna Ortega; Willem Dafoe
- Cinematography: Haris Zambarloukos
- Edited by: Jay Prychidny
- Music by: Danny Elfman
- Production companies: Warner Bros. Pictures Animation; The Geffen Company (Note: Copyright holder and studio credit only.); Plan B Entertainment; Tim Burton Productions
- Distributed by: Warner Bros. Pictures
- Release dates: August 28, 2024 (Venice); September 6, 2024 (United States)
- Running time: 104 minutes
- Country: United States
- Language: English
- Budget: $99–100 million
- Box office: $452 million

Beetlejuice Beetlejuice (stylized on-screen as Beetlejuice Beetlejuice: 2024 A.D.) is a 2024 American dark fantasy comedy film directed and co-produced by Tim Burton, from a screenplay by Alfred Gough and Miles Millar. A sequel to Beetlejuice (1988), the film stars Michael Keaton, Winona Ryder and Catherine O'Hara reprising their roles, with Justin Theroux, Monica Bellucci, Jenna Ortega and Willem Dafoe joining the cast. Set more than three decades after the first film, it follows Lydia Deetz, now a mother, struggling to keep her family together in the wake of a loss as Betelgeuse (Note: The title character's name is variously spelled "Betelgeuse", "Beetle Juice", and "Beetlejuice" in the film, script, and credits. The “Beetlejuice" spelling is used throughout this article for consistency.) returns to haunt her.

After the success of Beetlejuice, plans for a sequel were announced by The Geffen Film Company, its original producers, and little materialized until 2011 when Warner Bros. hired Seth Grahame-Smith to pitch a story, which went through numerous revisions before being shelved in late 2019. Plans for a sequel were revived in early 2022, with Burton set to co-produce with Brad Pitt's studio Plan B Entertainment. After the casting process finished in early 2023, principal photography, supervised by cinematographer Haris Zambarloukos, took place in parts of England and the U.S. from May to November, despite being suspended for four months due to the 2023 actors' strike. The official title was revealed in February 2024. During post-production, editing was handled by Jay Prychidny and the score was composed by longtime Burton collaborator Danny Elfman.

Beetlejuice Beetlejuice opened the 81st Venice International Film Festival on August 28, 2024, and was theatrically released in the United States and Canada on September 6. The film received generally positive reviews from critics and grossed $452 million worldwide on a budget of $99 million to $100 million.

== Plot ==
Lydia Deetz hosts a paranormal talk show called Ghost House and is estranged from her daughter Astrid, who doubts her mother's psychic abilities and that ghosts exist after her father Richard died while in the Amazon rainforest. While taping an episode, Lydia sees a vision of Betelgeuse, who tried to marry her decades prior, (Note: As depicted in Beetlejuice (1988).) in the audience.

Lydia and Astrid return to Winter River after Lydia's stepmother Delia reveals that her father Charles died in a shark attack. At his funeral, Lydia's selfish boyfriend and producer, Rory, pressures her into marrying him on Halloween and she hesitantly agrees. Meanwhile, Astrid befriends local boy Jeremy Frazier, who invites her to spend the holiday with him.

In the Netherworld, Betelgeuse manages a call centre consisting of shrunken-headed employees and remains obsessed with marrying Lydia. Former actor-turned-detective Wolf Jackson informs Betelgeuse that his ex-wife, occultist Delores LaFerve, has resurfaced and is draining the souls of the deceased while hunting him down. The couple met during the Black Death in Italy. When Delores poisoned Betelgeuse during their honeymoon as part of an immortality ritual, he dismembered her before succumbing.

Astrid realizes she has inherited her mother's abilities when she discovers that Jeremy is a ghost. He persuades her to accompany him to the Afterlife so she can see her father. After learning that Jeremy murdered his parents and is planning on using Astrid so he can live again, Lydia reluctantly summons Betelgeuse, who agrees to help on the condition that she finally marries him. Wolf discovers Betelgeuse has brought a living person into their world and launches a manhunt for him, capturing his disguised lead employee Bob, who is drained by Delores while he waits in an interrogation room.

As Betelgeuse and Lydia search for Astrid, Jeremy escorts her through the afterlife's bureaucracy, then reveals his true intent to Astrid, who is taken to the "Soul Train" to be sent to the "Great Beyond". But as she is dragged to the train, she sees her father Richard, who is working in the ticket office and follows her. After Richard helps Astrid and Lydia escape, Betelgeuse sends Jeremy to the "Fires of Damnation". During a mourning ceremony for Charles, Delia is fatally bitten by a pair of asps and arrives in the Netherworld; she summons Betelgeuse to help find Charles, agreeing in exchange for help finding Lydia.

Returning home, Astrid apologizes to Lydia for her initial disbelief. The duo arrive at the church for Lydia and Rory's wedding, but Betelgeuse crashes the ceremony with Delia. He injects Rory with "truth serum", forcing him to confess that he never believed in Lydia's abilities and is only a profiteering gold digger. As Betelgeuse takes over, Wolf and his fellow officers appear, only to be kept at bay before Delores arrives to avenge herself. With everyone else distracted, Astrid uses Jeremy's copy of the Handbook for the Recently Deceased to open a portal to Saturn's moon Titan and summons one of its Sandworms that devours Delores and Rory. She then reveals that Betelgeuse's marriage contract is voided due to him illegally bringing her mother into the Netherworld. Freed from the contract, Lydia banishes Betelgeuse back there.

Delia is then escorted back to the Netherworld by Wolf, reuniting with Charles at the Soul Train's station as the couple then depart for the Great Beyond together. Lydia ends Ghost House to spend more time with Astrid, despite Betelgeuse continuing to haunt her.

== Cast ==
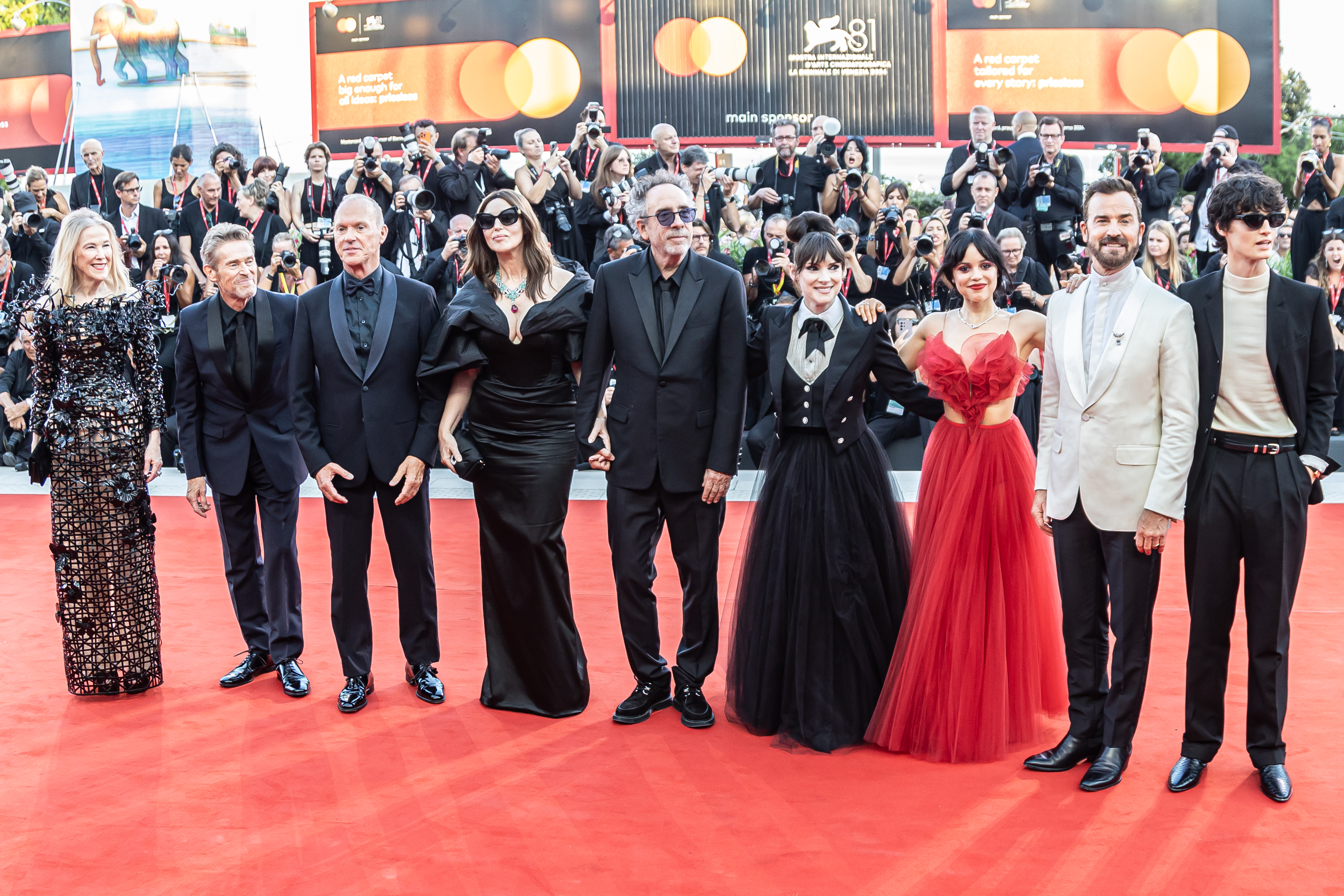
The cast and crew of Beetlejuice Beetlejuice at the 81st Venice International Film Festival

- Michael Keaton as Betelgeuse, a ghastly "bio-exorcist" who desires to marry someone from the living world. Both Keaton and director Tim Burton opted to keep the character as malicious and politically incorrect as he was in the original film due to their love for that character trait.
  - Burton additionally provides the voice of a newborn version of the character.
- Winona Ryder as Lydia Deetz, the former gothic teenager who was almost forced to marry Betelgeuse, now mother of Astrid Deetz and hostess of a talk show called Ghost House. Ryder initially imagined her character would live as a spinster in the Maitland residence's attic, but appreciated the development of her character, particularly around her relationship with daughter Astrid.
- Catherine O'Hara as Delia Deetz, Lydia's stepmother, Astrid's step-grandmother and Charles Deetz's widow, now the hostess of a real art show located in a SoHo gallery.
- Jenna Ortega as Astrid Deetz, Lydia's teenage daughter and Delia's step-granddaughter.
- Justin Theroux as Rory, a television producer and Lydia's ex-fiancé. He was inspired by the late Glenn Shadix's Otho Fenlock character from the original film. The writers Alfred Gough and Miles Millar devised him as a character who everyone wanted to see getting his comeuppance, like Otho, and enjoying the idea of Lydia being in a weird codependent relationship which everyone sees that way, herself included. Gough and Millar wanted the audience to understand why Rory is with Lydia and that he was a "schmuck", but they felt that they needed to find Rory's humanity without him being a mere punchline. Once Theroux was cast and connected with the writers over Zoom, he provided Gough and Millar with ideas they incorporated.
- Willem Dafoe as Wolf Jackson, a Netherworld detective who was a B movie action star in life before he was inadvertently killed by a live grenade.
- Monica Bellucci as Delores LaFerve, Betelgeuse's ex-wife, who, in life, was a mysterious and soul-collecting occultist who poisoned Betelgeuse several centuries earlier during the Black Death before he fatally mutilated her with an axe in retaliation.
- Arthur Conti as Jeremy Frazier, the ghost of a troubled teenager who murdered his parents and becomes Astrid's brief love interest.
- Burn Gorman as Father Damien, a comically eloquent Irish priest in Winter River.
- Santiago Cabrera as Richard, Astrid's late father and Lydia's ex-husband who was eaten alive by piranhas in the Amazon and is now employed at the Netherworld's civil service.
- Nick Kellington as Bob, the anxious leader of Betelgeuse's shrunken-headed employees at the Netherworld's call centre whose soul is later drained by Delores.
- Amy Nuttall as Jane Butterfield Jr., a local real estate agent and the daughter of the original film's Jane Butterfield Sr. character. She was previously portrayed by Rachel Mittelman in said film as a child.
- Paul Warren as Tom, a bald and one-eyed member of Betelgeuse's shrunken-headed employees.
- Mark Heenehan (physical) and Charlie Hopkinson (voice) as Charles Deetz, the Deetzes' late patriarch who recently died in a shark attack following an airplane crash in the Pacific Ocean that occurred during his return from a birdwatching trip and, as a result of this, is left without most of the upper half of his body in death. The character is depicted with the likeness of his original portrayer, Jeffrey Jones, through various means, including reused photographs and a stop motion sequence that describes the character's death. These circumstances were inspired by a nightmare of Burton's that detailed his own death.
- Danny DeVito as a janitor in the Netherworld whose soul is drained by Delores during her introduction.

In addition, Jane Leaney and David Ayres portray Jeremy's parents and Georgina Beedle portrays Janet, Wolf Jackson's shot-dead secretary, who "keeps him real", while Filipe Cates portrays Vlad, a vampire-portraying young man whom Astrid marries in a dream Lydia has in the film's epilogue.

== Production ==
=== Development ===
After the success of Beetlejuice (1988), a sequel was fast-tracked by The Geffen Film Company. Two Beetlejuice sequel scripts were commissioned in 1990: the first, Beetlejuice in Love, was penned by screenwriter Warren Skaaren, who did a heavy re-write on the first film's script. In Skaaren's sequel, Beetlejuice meets Leo, who plummets to his death while proposing to his girlfriend, Julia, on the Eiffel Tower. When Leo enters the afterlife, Beetlejuice escapes to the world of the living and pursues Julia. Skaaren died shortly after turning in his first draft of the In Love script. That same year, Tim Burton hired Jonathan Gems to write a potential Beetlejuice sequel titled Beetlejuice Goes Hawaiian. "Tim thought it would be funny to match the surfing backdrop of a beach movie with some sort of German Expressionism, because they're totally wrong together", Gems said. The story followed the Deetz family moving to Hawaii, where Charles is developing a resort. They soon discover that his company is building on the burial ground of an ancient Hawaiian Kahuna. The spirit comes back from the afterlife to cause trouble, and Beetlejuice becomes a hero by winning a surf contest with magic. Michael Keaton and Winona Ryder agreed to do the film, on the condition that Burton directed, but both he and Keaton became occupied with Batman Returns (1992).

Burton was still interested in Beetlejuice Goes Hawaiian in early 1991. Impressed with Daniel Waters' work on Heathers (1989), which also stars Winona Ryder, Burton approached him for a rewrite. However, he eventually signed Waters to write the script for Batman Returns. By August 1993, producer David Geffen hired Pamela Norris (Troop Beverly Hills, Saturday Night Live) to rewrite. Warner Bros. approached Kevin Smith in 1996 to rewrite the script, although Smith turned down the offer in favor of Superman Lives. Smith later joked that his response was, "Didn't we say all we needed to say in the first Beetlejuice? Must we go tropical?" In March 1997, Gems released a statement saying, "The Beetlejuice Goes Hawaiian script is still owned by The Geffen Company and it will likely never get made. You really couldn't do it now anyway. Winona is too old for the role, and the only way they could make it would be to totally recast it". Burton had considered several other sequel ideas as well over the years, saying in 2024, "We talked about lots of different things. That was early on when we were going, Beetlejuice and the Haunted Mansion, Beetlejuice Goes West, whatever. Lots of things came up", but all those initial scenarios set in Hawaii, the Wild West or Paris, France were all scrapped.

In September 2011, Warner Bros. hired Seth Grahame-Smith, who collaborated with Burton on Dark Shadows and Abraham Lincoln: Vampire Hunter (both 2012), to write and produce a sequel to Beetlejuice. Grahame-Smith signed on with the intention of doing "a story that is worthy of us actually doing this for real, something that is not just about cashing in, is not just about forcing a remake or a reboot down someone's throat". He was also adamant that Keaton would return and that Warner Bros. would not recast the role. Burton and Keaton had not officially signed on but would return if the script was good enough. Grahame-Smith met with Keaton in February 2012, "We talked for a couple of hours and talked about big picture stuff. It's a priority for Warner Bros. It's a priority for Tim. [Michael's] been wanting to do it for 20 years and he'll talk to anybody about it who will listen".

I don't wanna be the guy that destroys the legacy and the memory of the first film, I would rather die. I would rather just not make it, I'd rather just throw the whole thing away than make something that pays no respect and doesn't live up even close to the legacy of the first film. The story would be set in a real time frame from 1988. This will be a true 26 or 27 years later sequel. What's great is that for Beetlejuice, time means nothing in the afterlife, but the world outside is a different story.

— Seth Grahame-Smith (writer)

In November 2013, Ryder hinted at a possible return for the sequel as well by saying, "I'm kind of sworn to secrecy but it sounds like it might be happening. It's 27 years later. And I have to say, I love Lydia Deetz so much. She was such a huge part of me. I would be really interested in what she is doing 27 years later". Ryder confirmed that she would only consider making a sequel if Burton and Keaton were involved. In December 2014, Burton stated, "It's a character that I love and I miss actually working with Michael. There's only one Beetlejuice. We're working on a script and I think it's probably closer than ever and I'd love to work with him again". In January 2015, writer Grahame-Smith told Entertainment Weekly that the script was finished and that he and Burton intended to start filming Beetlejuice 2 by the end of the year, and that both Keaton and Ryder would return in their respective roles.

While negotiating to join the Netflix series Stranger Things as Joyce Byers in mid-2015, Ryder accepted that role under the sole request to the Duffer Brothers that if a Beetlejuice sequel were to be greenlit, they would let her take a break from the series to film it, as she and Burton had been having conversations about the project since 2000; the Duffers agreed. In August 2015, on Late Night with Seth Meyers, Ryder confirmed she would be reprising her role in the sequel. In May 2016, Burton stated, "It's something that I really would like to do in the right circumstances, but it's one of those films where it has to be right. It's not a kind of a movie that cries out [for a sequel], it's not the Beetlejuice trilogy. So it's something that if the elements are right—because I do love the character and Michael's amazing as that character, so yeah we'll see. But there's nothing concrete yet". In October 2017, Mike Vukadinovich was hired to re-write the script. In April 2019, Warner Bros. stated the sequel had been shelved.

=== Pre-production ===
In February 2022, a sequel was announced again, this time produced by Brad Pitt's studio Plan B Entertainment, alongside Warner Bros. Burton stated in October 2022 that he was not involved in the project, but backtracked days later, saying "nothing is out of the question". Burton ultimately returned as the film's director and tried to strip everything from the story to go to the basics of working with "good people, actors and puppets", feeling that the project made him reflect why he liked making films. Burton came up with the film's story upon thinking about Lydia Deetz, a character of his with whom he connected as a teenager, wondering what could have been of her life after the first film's events and how her family life could have developed, turning from a "cool teenager" into a "f—ed-up adult" who hosts a popular medium-related show titled Ghost House with Lydia Deetz whose daughter hates her, Burton credited the years of his life since the original film's release as the reason he could not do Beetlejuice Beetlejuice until then, having experienced many of those things himself, finding the project a very personal film starring a weird family in an emotional story of three generations experiencing basic things everyone feels in life when growing up. Burton and Keaton agreed to not use excessive amounts of technology, and sought to make the film feel "handmade". With a plot likened to Willy Wonka's psychedelic boat ride in Willy Wonka & the Chocolate Factory (1971), which takes "very big swings" like unhinged and uncontrollable phantasmagoria and Burton's head being "dumped out" onto the screen, Keaton felt the film's story to be stronger than its predecessor's, with "more of a connection" to the audience in terms of characters, finding "beyond delightful" things for which he was not ready while Ryder confidently expressed her belief that the film exceeded her high expectations and expected every generation to find something they can appreciate from the film.

In March 2023, it was reported by Variety that Jenna Ortega, who previously worked with Burton on the 2022 Netflix series Wednesday, was in talks to play Astrid Deetz, Lydia's daughter, while Burton was now expected to direct the film. Ortega and Ryder bonded as they worked together, sharing hobbies such as both being cinephiles and regarding the experience of working with each other special, resulting in Ortega developing her own performance for Astrid. In May, Danny Elfman announced he was returning to compose the score for the sequel, while it was also revealed Ortega was confirmed to star, and Wednesday creators Alfred Gough and Miles Millar wrote the script. Justin Theroux, Burn Gorman, Arthur Conti, Filipe Cates, and Willem Dafoe would also be added to the cast, in undisclosed roles, with Dafoe's being described as an afterlife officer. Dafoe later explained to Variety at the Marrakesh Film Festival that his character is an afterlife police officer who used to be a B movie action star in life before dying in an accident, with his skills leading him to become a detective within the realm. He later regretted sharing those details about his character, fearing that Burton may get angry with him for revealing a few spoilers from the film. Conti auditioned for the role over a Zoom call with Burton and a chemistry test with Ortega, receiving the news that he got the part on April Fools' Day, leading him to initially dismiss it as a practical joke. Catherine O'Hara reprises her role as Delia Deetz, as well as Monica Bellucci joining the cast as Betelgeuse's wife Delores. Gough did not originally write Delores' first victim, a deceased janitor, with an actor in mind, so Burton called his frequent collaborator Danny DeVito for the role and DeVito accepted it.

Colleen Atwood, a frequent collaborator of Burton, was announced to be working on the costume design for the film. Atwood disclosed that Betelgeuse's striped suit would return in the film, as it is trademark to the character's quintessential appearance in the same way the titular character of Lewis Carroll's novel Alice's Adventures in Wonderland (1865) sports an iconic blue dress, although Keaton disagreed and preferred Betelgeuse's burgundy tuxedo. For Lydia Deetz's attire, Atwood was inspired by Cassandra Peterson's iconic Elvira: Mistress of the Dark (1988) character. O'Hara later confirmed that the film would include Harry Belafonte's 1955 song "Day-O (The Banana Boat Song)", which was featured in the first film and serve as an unofficial memorial for Belafonte, who died just before the start of filming. The writers decided that the wedding sequence would feature a musical number with Betelgeuse "being the crazy ringleader of that whole situation", but were unsure of what song to use, and Burton suggested "MacArthur Park", which Gough found to be "the crazy, weird, insane thing you need at the end of this movie". Keaton insisted that Betelgeuse had limited screen time in the film like the first film, saying, "The idea was, no, no, no, you can't load it up with Betelgeuse, that'll kill it, the Betelgeuse character doesn't drive the story as much as he did in the first one. He's more part of the storyline in this one as opposed to the first one, which is a case of, this thing comes in and drives the movie a little bit".

=== Filming ===
Filming was originally scheduled to begin in mid-2022. Later, it was delayed to an expected start date of May 10, 2023, taking place in London if the 2023 WGA strike did not lead to another delay in production. Production was officially confirmed to have begun the following day, with Haris Zambarloukos serving as cinematographer and Jay Prychidny serving as editor. On May 18, 2023, it was reported that filming was taking place around the Princess Helena College in Preston, Hertfordshire, England. Exterior filming took place in East Corinth, Vermont (the location of the original film's outdoor scenes), in mid-2023. Filming was suspended in July due to the 2023 SAG-AFTRA strike. Burton described the film, which he enjoyed making, as being "99% done". It had two days of production left, which was interrupted, with Ortega being contacted to continue filming four days after the strike had ended. Filming resumed on November 16, 2023, in Melrose, Massachusetts, and wrapped in Vermont on November 30, 2023. East Corinth became an international tourist destination for fans of the two films.

=== Post-production ===
By March 2024, Keaton had seen a completed rough cut of the film and stated that further editing would occur thereafter. Later that month, it was stated in The Hollywood Reporter that Jeffrey Jones would not reprise his role as Charles Deetz in the film, his character being revealed in the trailers to have been killed off. It had been speculated that Jones did not return due to legal issues Jones had in the interim and the controversy surrounding films he has made since the early 2000s due to his status as a registered sex offender.

In April, Geena Davis stated she would not be returning as Barbara Maitland due to her age, saying, "Our characters were stuck the way they looked when they died forever, so it's been a while, it's been a minute". In August, Burton would confirm via People that Davis and Alec Baldwin did not return for Beetlejuice Beetlejuice as the Maitlands were not needed for the story he wanted to tell, which he admitted that he personally could not have done in 1989 due to it focusing on three generations within the Deetz family. To explain their absence, Burton stated that the film would reveal the Maitlands used a loophole to leave their former house during the interim between this film and the original. Gough told Entertainment Weekly that an early draft for the film had the Maitlands making a cameo appearance at the end, he and Millar discussing the idea with Burton, but all three moved on from the concept as they felt no de-aging technology would be convincing enough to make the audience believe that Davis and Baldwin had not aged since 1988. Also, they felt that the Maitlands' story had been told and their appearance would clash with Burton's decision to not make any fan service. In any event, much like Jones, legal issues would have prevented Baldwin from returning for the film due to the then-ongoing Rust shooting incident that saw Baldwin accidentally shoot and kill cinematographer Halyna Hutchins on the set of the film Rust (2024).

The production VFX supervisor was Angus Bickerton, working with VFX producer Alex Bicknell, supported by visual effects studios Framestore, One of Us and BUF Compagnie.

== Music ==
Danny Elfman, who scored Beetlejuice, returned for the sequel. The soundtrack to the film featured licensed music being incorporated in the film as well as two cues from Elfman's score being included. A cover of "Day-O (The Banana Boat Song)" is performed by Alfie Davis and the Sylvia Young Theatre School Choir and was released on May 23, 2024. The 11-song soundtrack was released by WaterTower Music on August 30, 2024, and a vinyl edition was released by Waxwork Records. The film's score, originally released in 2024 on digital, received a vinyl and CD release in 2025, again, through Waxwork Records.

== Release ==
Beetlejuice Beetlejuice opened the 81st Venice International Film Festival on August 28, 2024, at the Sala Grande in a non-competitive slot. The film was theatrically released by Warner Bros. Pictures on September 6, 2024, including IMAX, 4DX and ScreenX engagements. Warner Bros.' former regime considered releasing the film straight to streaming on HBO Max, but Burton butted heads with the studio over the film's costs and distribution; Warner was unsure on spending a projected $147 million on a sequel to a 1980s film from Burton, who had not had a hit since Alice in Wonderland (2010). Burton's demands were granted once Warner Bros. Motion Picture Group co-chairs and CEOs Michael De Luca and Pamela Abdy were installed in their positions in 2022, who agreed to a major theatrical release if the budget was under $100 million; Burton reportedly spent $99 million, thus fulfilling the deal. Initially, the film was supposed to be delayed to 2025, because of the 2023 SAG-AFTRA strike, despite most of the production having been completed. However, in February 2024, the producers reiterated the release date as well as revealing the official title. At their 2024 CineEurope presentation, Warner Bros. announced that the film would be released overseas on September 4, 2024, two days before its domestic premiere. The promotion included tie-in marketing deals with CarMax, Progressive, Secret, Denny's, Fanta, NYX, and Sally Hansen.

=== Home media ===
Beetlejuice Beetlejuice was released to video-on-demand platforms on October 8, 2024, then on DVD, Blu-ray and Ultra HD Blu-ray (as well as SteelBook) on November 19. The film premiered on HBO Max on December 6.

== Reception ==
=== Box office ===
Beetlejuice Beetlejuice grossed $294.1 million in the United States and Canada, and $157.9 million in other territories, for a worldwide total of $452 million.

In the United States and Canada, Beetlejuice Beetlejuice made $42 million on its first day, including $13 million from Thursday night previews. The film went on to debut with $111 million, registering the second biggest opening of September (behind It), the second biggest for Burton's career (behind Alice in Wonderland), and the third biggest opening of the year (behind Deadpool & Wolverine and Inside Out 2). Around 7.7 million admissions, 73% of the total weekend's box office earnings, came from the film alone. The opening weekend gross surpassed the entire $74 million run of the original film, unadjusted for inflation. The film then grossed $51.6 million in its second weekend (a drop of 54%), and $25.9 million its third weekend (a drop of 49%), beating newcomers Speak No Evil and Transformers One, and finishing in first for three consecutive weeks. It was eventually dethroned by The Wild Robot in its fourth weekend, grossing $16 million. The film ended its box office run as the sixth highest-grossing film of 2024 in the U.S. and Canada.

In other territories, the film debuted with $36.2 million from 69 markets. It had the biggest openings in the UK ($9.6 million), Mexico ($6.5 million), Australia ($2.6 million), Spain ($2.5 million) and Italy ($1.7 million).

=== Critical response ===
On the review aggregator website Rotten Tomatoes, 75% of 378 critics' reviews are positive. The website's consensus reads: "Michael Keaton's devious poltergeist still has plenty of juice left in this madcap return to form for Tim Burton, marrying charming practical effects and ghoulish gags to provide a fun fun time." Metacritic, which uses a weighted average, assigned the film a score of 62 out of 100, based on 61 critics, indicating "generally favorable" reviews. Audiences polled by CinemaScore gave the film an average grade of "B+" on an A+ to F scale, up from the "B" earned by the first film, while those surveyed by PostTrak gave it an 81% overall positive score, with 68% saying they would definitely recommend it.

Margaret Roarty of The Film Magazine stated that "the filmmaker manages to create something just as wacky and weird and meaningful as the original film." Jocelyn Noveck of the Associated Press gave it three out of four stars and wrote "In the Burtonian spirit, let's just say it took a long time to bake it, yes, but the director has recovered the recipe — at least enough to make us smile, chortle, even guffaw, for 104 minutes. And we can be happy with that." Matt Zoller Seitz of RogerEbert.com felt that it was "fun in direct proportion to how wanton and tossed-off it seems...[the] deranged final sequence...ranks with Burton's most decadent displays of pure inspiration. The movie seems to be having fun seeing how far it can push the content limits of a PG-13 rating." Owen Gleiberman of Variety felt that the film started "awkwardly, with Burton setting up his characters as if they were part of some 'Beetlejuice' board game. As it goes on, though, the pieces start to come together...'Beetlejuice Beetlejuice' is no 'Beetlejuice,' but in the end it's got just enough Burton juice."

Manohla Dargis of The New York Times called the film a "fun but less edgy sequel". Xan Brooks, writing for The Guardian, gave it two out of five stars and stated, "Burton's game attempt to bring the 1980s horror-comedy back from the spirit world is full of gaudy set-pieces but fails to add much to the original." David Fear of Rolling Stone called it "a perfectly fine fine sequel, neither a total letdown nor a complete, shout-it-from-the-hills return to form for its creator...Maybe we should have said his name — Burton Burton Burton — three times, and the filmmaker who did that beloved original would reappear, grinning maniacally and giving us something a bit less undead and a bit more alive."

The performances, particularly Ortega's, were praised. Fear called Ortega's casting "one of the few unimpeachable choices made here. It's not just that she and Ryder play well together, and make for a believable mother-daughter combo; rather, Ortega's ability to express vulnerability, exasperation, rage, and more via a world-class deadpan stare comes in handy when she's passed the mantle of My So-Called Afterlife Goth-teen moodiness from Ryder." Brooks felt that Ortega brought "just the right note of soulful sullenness" into her performance, and Zoller Seitz called her and Conti's performances "note-perfect," saying it enhanced their on-screen chemistry. He also praised Keaton's and Ryder's performance, calling Keaton "sensational, as always. He slips into Beetlejuice's rancid skin again with the prideful glee of one of those blessed old guys who keeps his prom tuxedo in a hall closet and can put it on any time he likes and have it fit perfectly" and Ryder "the standout. She conveys a sweetly glum and fragile presence, somebody who's been through a lot and changed as a result. She taps into the sense of a woman so dragged down by her mistakes and missed opportunities and random tragedies that she can't seem to get off the tracks she's been on for years now, or even change direction...She plays a seasoned, slightly battered grownup here, but her flutey croak of a voice still has music in it. She's wonderful with Theroux, who has that Jon Hamm gift of being able to play a self-involved twit without telegraphing that he's not actually that guy."

Allison Willmore of Vulture praised the lead performances: "While Michael Keaton slips zestfully back into the role of Beetlejuice like he never left, and the always reliable O'Hara is spookily unchanged, Ryder plays Lydia, poignantly, as a brittle adult who's stuck dressing in the style she affected a few decades ago, as though she'd gotten interrupted before she could fully finish growing up."

Others, however, were less enthusiastic regarding Keaton. Brooks called him "one of the more superfluous acts in this retro circus, on hand to introduce the film's hand-tooled effects and strongarm [sic] the plot twists...But he remains a mothballed, one-note presence, a series of wisecracks in search of a point." Fear also described Keaton's performance as lackluster.

=== Accolades ===
Award	Date of ceremony	Category	Nominee(s)	Result	Ref.
Astra Midseason Movie Awards	July 3, 2024	Most Anticipated Movie	Beetlejuice Beetlejuice	Nominated	
Venice International Film Festival	September 7, 2024	Graffetta d'Oro for Best Film	Beetlejuice Beetlejuice	Won	
Astra Creative Arts Awards	December 8, 2024	Best Costume Design	Colleen Atwood	Nominated	
Astra Creative Arts Awards	December 8, 2024	Best Makeup and Hairstyling	Beetlejuice Beetlejuice	Nominated	
Astra Creative Arts Awards	December 8, 2024	Best Marketing Campaign	Beetlejuice Beetlejuice	Nominated	
Astra Creative Arts Awards	December 8, 2024	Best Visual Effects	Beetlejuice Beetlejuice	Nominated	
San Diego Film Critics Society	December 9, 2024	Best Comedic Performance	Michael Keaton	Runner-up	
San Diego Film Critics Society	December 9, 2024	Best Costume Design	Colleen Atwood	Nominated	
Golden Globe Awards	January 5, 2025	Cinematic and Box Office Achievement	Beetlejuice Beetlejuice	Nominated	
Saturn Awards	February 2, 2025	Best Fantasy Film	Beetlejuice Beetlejuice	Won	
Saturn Awards	February 2, 2025	Best Film Direction	Tim Burton	Nominated	
Saturn Awards	February 2, 2025	Best Film Writing	Alfred Gough & Miles Millar	Nominated	
Saturn Awards	February 2, 2025	Best Actor in a Film	Michael Keaton	Nominated	
Saturn Awards	February 2, 2025	Best Actress in a Film	Winona Ryder	Nominated	
Saturn Awards	February 2, 2025	Best Supporting Actor in a Film	Willem Dafoe	Nominated	
Saturn Awards	February 2, 2025	Best Younger Actor in a Film	Jenna Ortega	Won	
Saturn Awards	February 2, 2025	Best Film Editing	Jay Prychidny	Nominated	
Saturn Awards	February 2, 2025	Best Film Music	Danny Elfman	Won	
Saturn Awards	February 2, 2025	Best Film Production Designer	Mark Scruton	Nominated	
Saturn Awards	February 2, 2025	Best Film Costume Design	Colleen Atwood	Won	
Saturn Awards	February 2, 2025	Best Film Special / Visual Effects	Angus Bickerton, James Brennan-Craddock, Neal Scanlan & Stefano Pepin	Nominated	
AARP Movies for Grownups Awards	February 23, 2025	Best Ensemble	The cast of Beetlejuice Beetlejuice	Nominated	
Nickelodeon Kids' Choice Awards	June 21, 2025	Favorite Movie	Beetlejuice Beetlejuice	Nominated	
Nickelodeon Kids' Choice Awards	June 21, 2025	Favorite Movie Actress	Jenna Ortega	Nominated	
Nickelodeon Kids' Choice Awards	June 21, 2025	Favorite Movie Actress	Winona Ryder	Nominated	
Nickelodeon Kids' Choice Awards	June 21, 2025	Favorite Villain	Michael Keaton	Nominated	

The film was shortlisted on December 18, 2024, for Best Makeup and Hairstyling and Best Music (Original Score) at the 97th Academy Awards.

== Future ==
Though cast members expressed interest in a potential third film, Burton said, "Let's do the math ... it took 35 years to do this, so I'll be over 100. But I guess it's possible with the advent of science these days, but I don't think so". In April 2025, Warner Bros. Pictures CEO Michael De Luca stated that a sequel was in the works. However, in July 2025, Burton cast doubt on the possibility of a third film in an interview with The Hollywood Reporter, stating that no one contacted him about it. In the same interview, Jenna Ortega stated she would be open to reprising her role as Astrid only if Burton was involved in directing.

In November 2026, writers Alfred Gough and Miles Millar suggested that a third film was unlikely, following Catherine O'Hara's death in January 2026.

== See also ==
- List of films set around Halloween
