= The Strip (American TV series) =

- Genre: Action drama
- Created by: Alfred Gough; Miles Millar
- Written by: Russel Friend; Daniel Freudenberger; Alfred Gough; Charles Holland; Garrett Lerner; Miles Millar; Mark Verheiden; David Weinstein
- Directed by: Paul Abascal; Félix Enríquez Alcalá; Greg Beeman; Julian Chojnacki; D. J. Caruso; Vern Gillum; Alan J. Levi; Peter Markle; Whitney Ransick
- Starring: Sean Patrick Flanery; Guy Torry; Joe Viterelli; Stacey Dash
- Opening theme: Cumbionda mix by Argento Vivo (Canale 21 airings in Italy only)
- Composers: Christopher Lennertz; Mark Mancina; Tom Rizzo
- Country of origin: United States
- Original language: English
- No. of seasons: 1
- No. of episodes: 10

Production
- Executive producers: Alfred Gough; Miles Millar; Joel Silver
- Production locations: Las Vegas, Nevada
- Cinematography: Christopher Faloona; Andres L. Porras
- Editors: Ron Spring; Rick Tuber; Kerry Michael Tym
- Running time: 45 minutes
- Production companies: Silver Pictures Television; Millar Gough Ink; Warner Bros. Television

Original release
- Network: UPN
- Release: October 12, 1999 – July 7, 2000

The Strip is an American action drama series created by Alfred Gough and Miles Millar, which aired on UPN from October 12, 1999 to July 7, 2000, during the 1999–2000 television season. The drama series was produced by Silver Pictures Television, Millar Gough Ink and Warner Bros. Television.

== Synopsis ==
Sean Patrick Flanery and Guy Torry portray former Las Vegas Metropolitan Police Department detectives who are hired by the owner of Caesars Palace to serve as "troubleshooters" protecting his interests.

The series was cancelled after nine episodes, with a tenth episode airing months later in July 2000.

== Cast ==
- Sean Patrick Flanery as Elvis Ford
- Guy Torry as Jesse Weir
- Joe Viterelli as Cameron Green
- Brett Rickaby as Chad
- Keith Odett as Tad
- Stacey Dash as Vanessa Weir
- Jeff Eagle as Felix Cramer

== Episodes ==
No.	Title	Original release date	Prod. code
1	"Games Without Frontiers"	October 12, 1999	226003
2	"Send Me an Angel"	October 19, 1999	226002
3	"Murder by Numbers"	October 26, 1999	226004
4	"Winner Takes It All"	November 2, 1999	226006
5	"Even Better Than the Real Thing"	November 9, 1999	226005
6	"Use Your Illusion"	November 16, 1999	226007
7	"We Will Rock You"	November 23, 1999	226008
8	"Money for Nothing"	December 14, 1999	226009
9	"I Wear My Sunglasses at Night"	January 11, 2000	226010
10	"Pilot"	July 7, 2000	226001

== Production ==
The Strip was picked up by UPN as a series in March 1999. It was created by Alfred Gough and Miles Millar, who served as executive producers alongside Joel Silver.

The series was shot during 1999, at various locations in the Las Vegas Valley, including the real Caesars Palace resort. Other locations used throughout the series included the Stratosphere resort, Eldorado Dry Lake, and a warehouse in Henderson, Nevada that served as a soundstage facility. The series premiered on October 12, 1999, and was canceled six weeks later.

== Distribution ==
In the Czech Republic, the series was broadcast as "Bulvár Strip" from 2001 to 2002.

In Italy, the show first aired on 7Gold with DEA5 dubbing under the title "La Striscia" from 2009 to 2010. It was also featured on Telecapri, Telecapri News, and occasionally Telecity 1.

In December 2014, the series returned to 7Gold with the new title "La Striscia - Viale Strip di Las Vegas," but only 5 of the 10 episodes were broadcast. The series was moved from its afternoon slot to late night at 11:55pm, and subsequently aired in the midnight block of Sette Notte (Monday to Saturday late evening, and Sundays at 8pm). On December 26, 2014, the series faced criticism for its scheduling and similarities between its title and the Italian version "Viale Strip." To boost ratings, the series returned to also briefly air in the afternoon from December 29, 2014, to January 1, 2015, replacing teleshopping. Despite these efforts, it was removed from the schedule on January 2, 2015, due to poor performance.

On January 15, 2018, the series resumed on Canale 21 as "Viale Strip" with episodes cropped to 16:9, redubbed by DEA5, and a new intro, 'Cumbionda Mix' by Argento Vivo. This version became a flagship series of Neapolitan television, with all 10 episodes broadcast. It aired as part of the Pomeriggio Rosa block until March 19, 2018. From 10 to May 21, 2021 it was re-broadcast on the same channel.

In Turkey, the series began airing on Nickelodeon and Show TV on June 30, 2024. It is shown every Thursday at 3 pm on Nickelodeon and every Saturday and Sunday at 2 am on Show TV under the title "Vegas Şeridi". It stopped airing on both channels as of December 9, 2024.

The series is not currently available for streaming on Max.

== Reception ==
Ray Richmond of Variety wrote: "As shallow and contrived as The Strip often proves to be, there is also something wonderful about a show that ain't afraid to wear its testosterone and aggression on its sleeve".
