= Sister of Mine =

- Theatrical release poster
- Spanish: Demonios tus ojos
- Directed by: Pedro Aguilera
- Screenplay by: Pedro Aguilera; Juan Carlos Sampedro
- Produced by: Pedro Aguilera; Cristina Gallego; Antonello Novellino
- Starring: Ivana Baquero; Julio Perillán; Lucía Guerrero; Nicolás Coronado; Elisabet Gelabert; Juan Pablo Shuk
- Cinematography: Miquel Prohens
- Edited by: Imanol Ruiz de Lara
- Music by: Richard Córdoba
- Production companies: Ciudad Lunar; Carmelita Films
- Distributed by: Good Films (es)
- Release dates: January 2017 (Rotterdam); 12 May 2017 (Spain)
- Countries: Spain; Colombia
- Languages: Spanish; English

Sister of Mine (Spanish: Demonios tus ojos) is a 2017 Spanish-Colombian incest-themed erotic drama film directed by Pedro Aguilera which stars Ivana Baquero and Julio Perillán alongside Lucía Guerrero, Nicolás Coronado, Elisabet Gelabert and Juan Pablo Shuk.

== Plot ==
Oliver, a Los Angeles-based erotic film director, finds out by chance an explicit video featuring his little half sister Aurora. He thereby goes back to his hometown in Madrid, where his obsession with Aurora gets him to secretly install a webcam in the latter's bedroom.

== Cast ==
- Ivana Baquero as Aurora
- Julio Perillán as Oliver
- Lucía Guerrero
- Nicolás Coronado as Carlos
- Elisabet Gelabert as Aurora's mother
- Juan Pablo Shuk
- Susana Gil as Karen

== Production ==
The screenplay was penned by Pedro Aguilera alongside Juan Carlos Sampedro. The film is a Spanish-Colombian co-production. Production companies included Carmelita Films and Ciudad Lunar.

== Release ==
The film screened at the 46th International Film Festival Rotterdam (IFFR) in January 2017.

Distributed by Good Films, the film was theatrically released in Spain on 12 May 2017.

== Reception ==
Eulàlia Iglesias of El Confidencial considered that while Pedro Aguilera handles extreme material, the film "fails to become the transgressive and borderline film it was intended to be", while she praised Baquero's performance.

Quim Casas of El Periódico de Catalunya scored 3 out of 5 stars, deeming the film to be "a tale of seduction and obsession" with an extreme proposal that is not fully delivered, but which leaves more than one disturbance along the way.

Jonathan Rommey of ScreenDaily pointed out that, presence of "sibling incest, camcorder voyeurism, even a splash of mud-soaked bondage" notwithstanding, the film, "though confidently executed, comes across as a solemn damp squib", highlighting that it "doesn't have much more to offer in the way of psychological insight".

Jordi Costa of El País described the film as "an absorbing story about the transgression of taboos in a universe governed by the toxicity of the gaze and the devaluation of the power of the image due to the over-saturation of stimuli".

Carlos Marañón of Cinemanía gave the film 3½ out of 5 stars, considering that Chabrolian mystery-like picture is underpinned by both the director's formal vigour and by the truthful performance delivered by Ivana Baquero.

== See also ==
- List of Spanish films of 2017
