= Miles Millar =

Australian-British screenwriter and producer (born 1967)

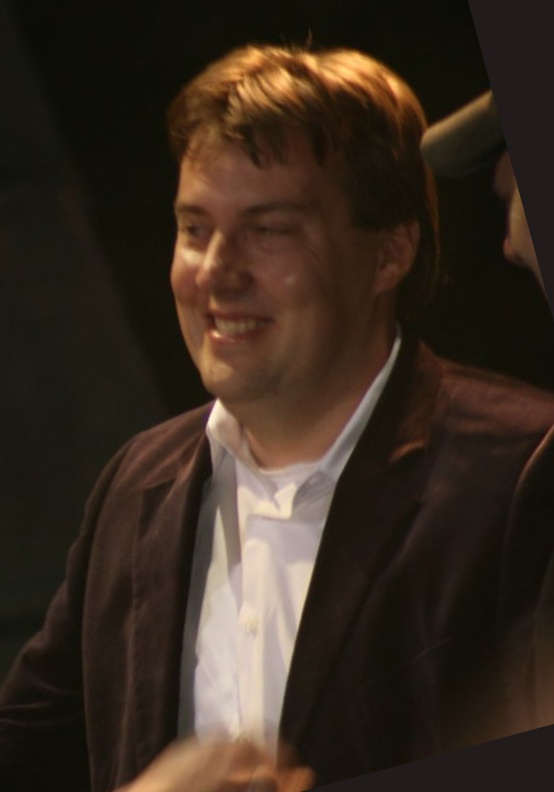
- Born: 1967 (age 58–59); Australia
- Education: Christ's College, Cambridge; University of Southern California
- Occupations: Screenwriter; producer; co-creator; creator; showrunner; director; executive producer
- Known for: Smallville; Spider-Man 2 Wednesday

Miles Millar (/ˈmɪlər/ MIL-ər; born 1967) is an Australian-British screenwriter, showrunner, producer, creator, developer, and director.

He is best known as the creator of Netflix's 2022 live-action comedy horror series Wednesday, the Tim Burton helmed Addams Family spin-off. It holds the record as the most-watched English language series in the history of Netflix.

Alongside his longtime writing/producing partner Alfred Gough, Millar also created, produced, wrote, and developed other television programs like The WB/The CW's action-adventure Superman-prequel television hit series Smallville, AMC's 2015 wuxia-influenced dystopian television series Into the Badlands and MTV's 2016 epic fantasy drama television series The Shannara Chronicles (based on The Sword of Shannara Trilogy book trilogy by Terry Brooks). He also co-wrote other feature films like Tom Dey's Shanghai Noon and its sequel Shanghai Knights, Sam Raimi's Spider-Man 2 and Rob Cohen's blockbuster action-adventure film The Mummy: Tomb of the Dragon Emperor, as well as Tim Burton's Beetlejuice Beetlejuice, the sequel to the iconic 1988 movie. He has worked alongside his writing/producing partner Alfred Gough since they met at USC School of Cinematic Arts.

== Early life ==
Miles Millar grew up in Sydney, Australia but emigrated to the United Kingdom when he was 9 years old. He was educated at Claremont Fan Court School, and is a graduate of Christ's College, Cambridge. He attended The Peter Stark Producing Program at the University of Southern California where he teamed up with his writing/producing partner, Alfred Gough.

They sold their first script while still studying at USC. "Mango", a buddy-cop story where a cop who was allergic to animals was paired with an orangutan, sold to New Line Cinema for $400,000. The film was never made, but proved to be a professional launching pad.

== Career ==
Miles Millar and his professional partner Alfred Gough are prolific writers/producers. The films Millar and Gough have written or produced have a combined global box office in excess of one billion dollars. Their feature credits include Sam Raimi's Spider-Man 2, Tom Dey's Shanghai Noon, as well as its 2003 sequel, Shanghai Knights, starring Jackie Chan and Owen Wilson, Rob Cohen's action-adventure The Mummy: Tomb of the Dragon Emperor, Herbie: Fully Loaded, Richard Donner's Lethal Weapon 4, and D. J. Caruso's science fiction action I Am Number Four. Millar and Gough also produced Hannah Montana: The Movie, which was based on the Disney Channel smash hit teen sitcom TV series of the same name starring Miley Cyrus. The feature marked the first film for the duo's Disney-based production company.

Millar and Gough’s work also spans the world of television. The duo created and served as executive producers/showrunners of the Superman-based television action-adventure series Smallville, which aired from October 16, 2001 to May 13, 2011. It is the longest-running live-action comic book-based television series of all time, and was the No. 1 show in the history of The WB. Millar and Gough left the series in 2008, after seven seasons, breaking the news of their departure with an open letter posted to a Smallville fan site. In 2010, the duo filed a multimillion-dollar lawsuit against WB Television, claiming that Warner Bros., the studio that produced Smallville, had undercut potential profits by selling the series to WB network which it owned, thereby cutting the duo out of tens of millions of dollars. The lawsuit was finally settled in May 2013, mere weeks before a scheduled June trial; the terms of the settlement were not made known to the public.

In 2015, Millar and Gough began creating and producing the epic fantasy television series The Shannara Chronicles for MTV. It is an adaptation of The Sword of Shannara trilogy of fantasy novels by Terry Brooks. It follows three heroes as they protect an ancient tree to stop the escape of banished demons. The series was filmed in the Auckland Film Studios and on location elsewhere in New Zealand. The series starred Austin Butler, Ivana Baquero and Manu Bennett. Jon Favreau was one of the executive producers along with Dan Farrah. The pilot episode was directed by Jonathan Liebesman.

The first season of The Shannara Chronicles premiered on MTV in the United States on January 5, 2016, and consisted of 10 episodes. MTV originally greenlit a second season in April 2016; however, in May 2017, it was announced that the series would relocate to Spike (now Paramount Network). The second season premiered on October 11, 2017, and concluded November 22, 2017. On January 16, 2018, it was announced that the series had been cancelled after two seasons and that the producers were shopping the series to other networks. The series was later considered officially concluded but has since generated a cult following on Netflix.

In June 2015, the duo began creating and producing the wuxia-influenced dystopian television series Into the Badlands for AMC Networks. The martial arts drama was set in a gun free post apocalyptic America where warring barons had personal armies of lethally trained fighters. The series was notable as one of the only hour long dramas in American television history to feature an Asian American (Daniel Wu) as its lead. The show was a ratings hit, but received a mix response from critics. Nick Frost joined the cast in season two and proved a very popular addition to the fans of the series. The show's mythology was very loosely based on the classic Chinese text, Journey to the West. Each episode featured intricate martial arts fights that were staged and directed by legendary Hong Kong fight choreographers Huen Chiu Ku (aka Master Dee Dee Ku) and Andy Cheng. The series starred Daniel Wu, Marton Csokas, Emily Beecham, Aramis Knight and Orla Brady. The first season was filmed in New Orleans, but subsequent seasons were shot in and around Dublin, Ireland. Into The Badlands ran for 32 episodes and was cancelled due to a regime change at AMC Networks. Millar directed episodes 13 and 14 in season three of the series.

In October 2020, Millar and Gough sold a series to Netflix based on the character of Wednesday Addams. The series was created by Millar and Gough, but Tim Burton teamed with the duo as an executive producer and directed the first four episodes. Wednesday represents Burton's first foray into television and stars Jenna Ortega in the title role. The series also stars Catherine Zeta-Jones as Morticia Addams, Luis Guzman as Gomez Addams as well as Gwendoline Christie as Larissa Weems. Since the show's premiere, it has become the most viewed English-language series on Netflix at 1.7 billion streaming hours. The show was a critical hit and was recognized with numerous awards. Millar and Gough were nominated for Golden Globe, BAFTA and Emmy awards. The show was nominated for 12 Emmys and won four. It was awarded the Saturn Award for best Fantasy Series, Critics' Choice Super Award for Best Limited Series, Kid’s Choice Award for Favorite Family TV Show. Millar, Gough, Burton, and Ortega collaborated again on Beetlejuice Beetlejuice, set for release in September 2024.

In May 2024, it was announced that the second season of Wednesday had commenced production in Dublin, Ireland. A promo featuring Thing delivering scripts and announcing the new cast was directed by Millar, as well as returning cast, Jenna Ortega, Emma Myers, Catherine Zeta-Jones, Luis Guzman, Hunter Doohan, Georgie Farmer, new additions include Steve Buscemi, Joanna Lumley, Thandiwe Newton, Heather Matarazzo, and Evie Templeton.

Millar and Gough signed a first-look deal with Sony Pictures in April 2024 to develop films through the Millar/Gough Ink banner.

Millar and Gough were also known as the producers of UPN's action drama series The Strip (starring Sean Patrick Flannery), as well as ABC's 2011 reboot of Charlie's Angels, with the final episode of the latter series left unaired in the United States. Millar and Gough also began operating the production company, Millar/Gough Ink, back in October 1999.

Millar and Gough also produced the 2006 live-action pilot of Aquaman, based on the DC Comics character of the same name.

== Filmography ==
=== Film ===
Writer

- Double Tap (1997)
- Lethal Weapon 4 (1998)
- Made Men (1999)
- Shanghai Noon (2000)
- Showtime (2002)
- Shanghai Knights (2003)
- Spider-Man 2 (2004) (Story only)
- Herbie: Fully Loaded (2005)
- The Mummy: Tomb of the Dragon Emperor (2008)
- I Am Number Four (2011)
- Beetlejuice Beetlejuice (2024)

Producer

- E=mc2 (1996) (Associate producer)
- Aquaman (2006) (Unsold pilot; Executive producer and writer)
- Hannah Montana: The Movie (2009)
- Bullet to the Head (2012)

=== Television ===
Year	Title	Director	Writer	Executive Producer	Creator	Notes
1995–1997	Bugs	No	Yes	No	No	2 episodes.
1997–1998	Timecop	No	Yes	No	No	9 episodes (written 3).
1998	Black Jaq	No	Story	No	No	
1998–1999	Martial Law	No	Yes	No	No	Co-producer (12 episodes).
1999	Made Men	No	Yes	No	No	
1999–2000	The Strip	No	Yes	Yes	Yes	10 episodes (written 2)
2001–2011	Smallville	Yes	Yes	Yes	Developer	217 episodes (written 13).
2006	Aquaman	No	Yes	Yes	No	Unaired pilot.
2011	Charlie's Angels	No	Yes	Yes	Developer	8 episodes (written 4)
2015–2019	Into the Badlands	Yes	Yes	Yes	Yes	32 episodes (written 10)
2016–2017	The Shannara Chronicles	No	Yes	Yes	Yes	20 episodes (written 4).
2022–present	Wednesday	No	Yes	Yes	Yes	16 episodes (written 7).
