= Alfred Gough =

American screenwriter and producer (born 1967)

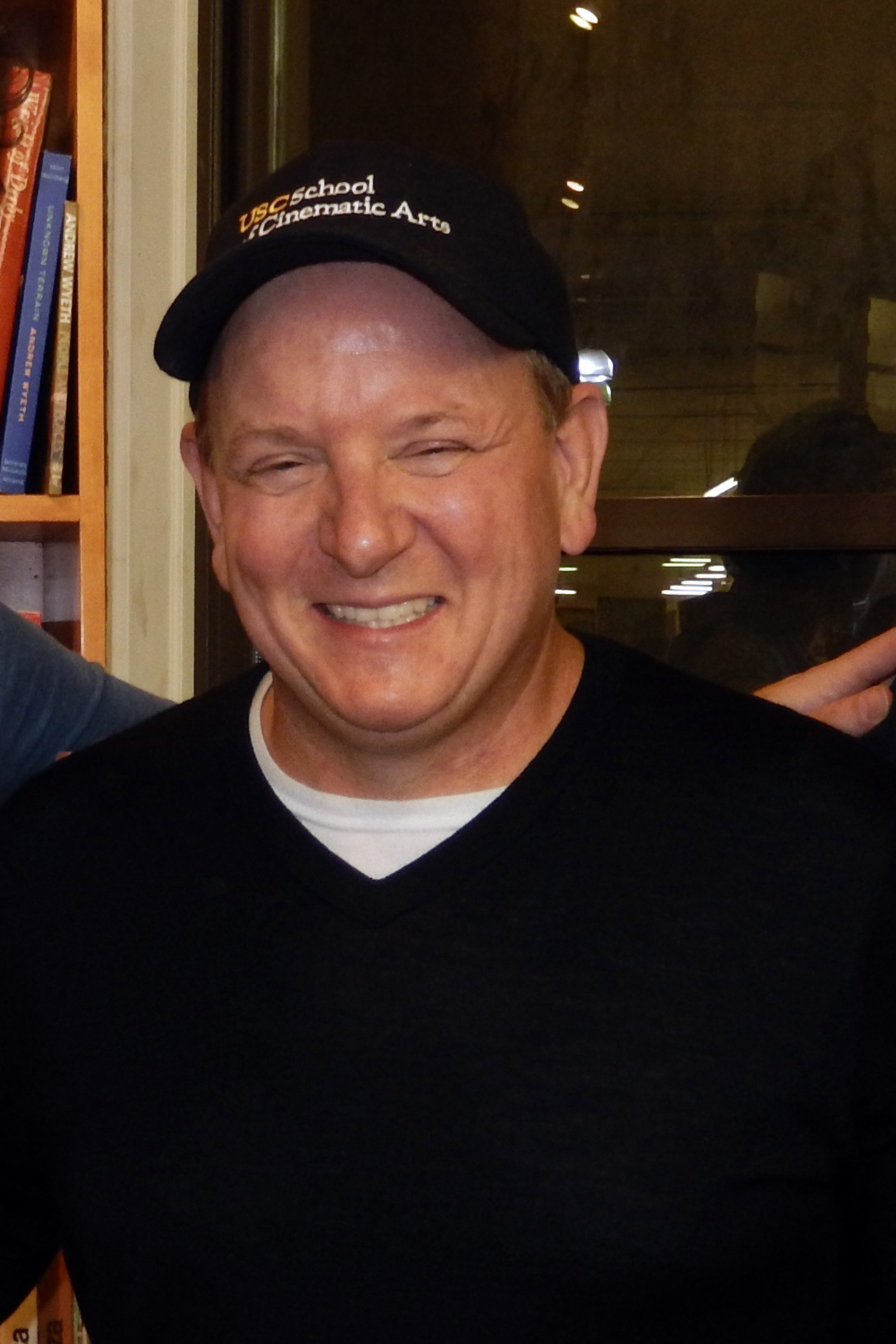
- Gough in 2019
- Born: Alfred Gough III; August 22, 1967 (age 58); Leonardtown, Maryland, U.S.
- Education: USC School of Cinematic Arts
- Occupations: Screenwriter, producer
- Known for: Smallville; Spider-Man 2 Wednesday
- Spouse: Beth Corets (m. 1996)
- Children: 3

Alfred Gough (/ˈɡɒf/ GOF; born August 22, 1967) is an American screenwriter, producer, writer, director, showrunner and creator. He is the developer of The WB/The CW's Superman-prequel television series Smallville. Alongside longtime writing/producing partner Miles Millar, Gough co-created other television programs like AMC's 2015 wuxia-influenced dystopian television series Into the Badlands, MTV's 2016 epic fantasy television series The Shannara Chronicles (based on The Sword of Shannara Trilogy book trilogy by Terry Brooks) and Netflix's Wednesday, the Tim Burton-helmed Addams Family spin-off. Among his feature film credits he wrote or produced are Shanghai Noon and its sequel Shanghai Knights, Spider-Man 2, The Mummy: Tomb of the Dragon Emperor, Herbie: Fully Loaded, Hannah Montana: The Movie and Burton's Beetlejuice Beetlejuice.

== Early life ==
Born in Leonardtown, Maryland, Al Gough graduated from St. Mary's Ryken High School (1985) and The Catholic University of America (1989). Gough attended The Peter Stark Producing Program at the University of Southern California where he teamed up with his writing partner Miles Millar.

Gough and Millar sold their first script while still studying at USC. Mango, a buddy-cop story where a cop who was allergic to animals was paired with an orangutan, sold to New Line Cinema for $400,000. The film was never made, but launched the duo's professional careers.

== Career ==
Alfred Gough and Miles Millar are prolific writers/producers. Their feature credits include the action-adventure The Mummy: Tomb of the Dragon Emperor, the action-comedy Shanghai Noon and its sequel Shanghai Knights, Spider-Man 2 directed by Sam Raimi, Herbie: Fully Loaded, Lethal Weapon 4, and I Am Number Four. Along with Millar, Gough produced Hannah Montana: The Movie, based on the Disney Channel teen sitcom series of the same name. The feature was the first film for the duo's Walt Disney Company-based independent production studio, Millar/Gough Ink.

Gough and Millar's work includes television. Gough and Millar created and served as executive producers/showrunners for the and Superman-based action-adventure series Smallville, which aired from October 16, 2001 to May 13, 2011. Smallville is the longest-running comic book-based series and was the top show in the history of the WB Television Network. Gough and Millar left the series in 2008, after seven seasons, breaking the news of their departure with an open letter posted to a Smallville fan site.

In 2015, Gough and Millar began production of The Shannara Chronicles, an epic fantasy television series Millar Gough Ink created and produced for MTV. It is an adaptation of The Sword of Shannara trilogy of fantasy novels by Terry Brooks. It follows three heroes as they protect an ancient tree to stop the escape of banished demons. The series was filmed in the Auckland Film Studios and on location elsewhere in New Zealand. The series starred Austin Butler, Ivana Baquero and Manu Bennett. Jon Favreau was one of the executive producers along with Dan Farrah. The pilot episode was directed by Jonathan Liebesman.

The first season of The Shannara Chronicles premiered on MTV in the United States on January 5, 2016, and consisted of 10 episodes. MTV originally greenlit a second season in April 2016; however, in May 2017, it was announced that the series would relocate to Spike (now Paramount Network). The second season premiered on October 11, 2017, and concluded November 22, 2017. On January 16, 2018, it was announced that the series had been cancelled after two seasons and that the producers were shopping the series to other networks. The series was later considered officially concluded but has since generated a cult following on Netflix.

In June 2015, Gough and Millar began production of Into the Badlands a series the company created for AMC Networks. The martial arts drama was set in a gun-free post-apocalyptic United States where warring barons have personal armies of lethally trained fighters. The series was notable as one of the only hour long dramas in American television history to feature an Asian American (Daniel Wu) as its lead. The show was a ratings hit, but received a mix response from critics. Nick Frost joined the cast in season two. The show's mythology was very loosely based on the classic Chinese text Journey to the West. Each episode featured intricate martial arts fights that were staged and directed by Hong Kong fight choreographers Huen Chiu Ku and Andy Cheng. The series starred Daniel Wu, Marton Csokas, Emily Beecham, Aramis Knight and Orla Brady. The first season was filmed in New Orleans, subsequent seasons were shot in and around Dublin, Ireland. Into The Badlands ran for 32 episodes and was cancelled due to a regime change at AMC Networks.

In October 2020, Millar and Gough sold a series to Netflix based on the character of Wednesday Addams. The series was created by Millar and Gough; Tim Burton worked with the duo as an executive producer and directed the first four episodes. Wednesday is Burton's first foray into television. Jenna Ortega portrays the title role. The series stars Catherine Zeta-Jones as Morticia Addams, Luis Guzman as Gomez Addams and Gwendoline Christie as Larissa Weems. It is the most viewed English-language series on Netflix at 1.7 billion streaming hours. The show was a critical hit and was recognized with numerous awards. Millar and Gough were nominated for a Golden Globe, a BAFTA and an Emmy awards. The show was nominated for 12 Emmys and won four. It was awarded the Saturn Award for best Fantasy Series, Critics' Choice Super Award for Best Limited Series, Kid's Choice Award for Favorite Family TV Show. Millar, Gough, Burton, and Ortega collaborated again on Beetlejuice Beetlejuice, released in September 2024.

Gough and Millar signed a first-look deal with Sony Pictures in April 2024 to develop films through the Millar/Gough Ink banner.

Millar/Gough Ink produced ABC's 2011 action crime drama Charlie's Angels. It produced the 2006 television pilot of Aquaman, which was based on the DC Comics character of the same name.

== Personal life ==
Gough has been married to Beth Corets, an attorney, since September 1, 1996. They have three children.

== Filmography ==
=== Film ===
Writer

- Double Tap (1997)
- Lethal Weapon 4 (1998)
- Made Men (1999)
- Shanghai Noon (2000)
- Showtime (2002)
- Shanghai Knights (2003)
- Spider-Man 2 (2004) (Story only)
- Herbie: Fully Loaded (2005)
- The Mummy: Tomb of the Dragon Emperor (2008)
- I Am Number Four (2011)
- Beetlejuice Beetlejuice (2024)

Producer

- Hannah Montana: The Movie (2009)
- Bullet to the Head (2012)

=== Television ===
Year	Title	Writer	Executive producer	Creator
1995–1997	Bugs	Yes	No	No
1997–1998	Timecop	Yes	No	No
1998	Black Jaq	Yes	Co-executive	No
1998–1999	Martial Law	Yes	Co-executive	No
1999–2000	The Strip	Yes	Yes	Yes
2001–2011	Smallville	Yes	Yes	Developer
2006	Aquaman	No	Yes	Yes
2006	Smallville: Vengeance Chronicles	No	Yes	No
2011	Charlie's Angels	Yes	Yes	Developer
2015–2019	Into the Badlands	Yes	Yes	Yes
2016–2018	The Shannara Chronicles	Yes	Yes	Yes
2022–present	Wednesday	Yes	Yes	Yes
