= Ivana Baquero =

Spanish actress (born 1994)

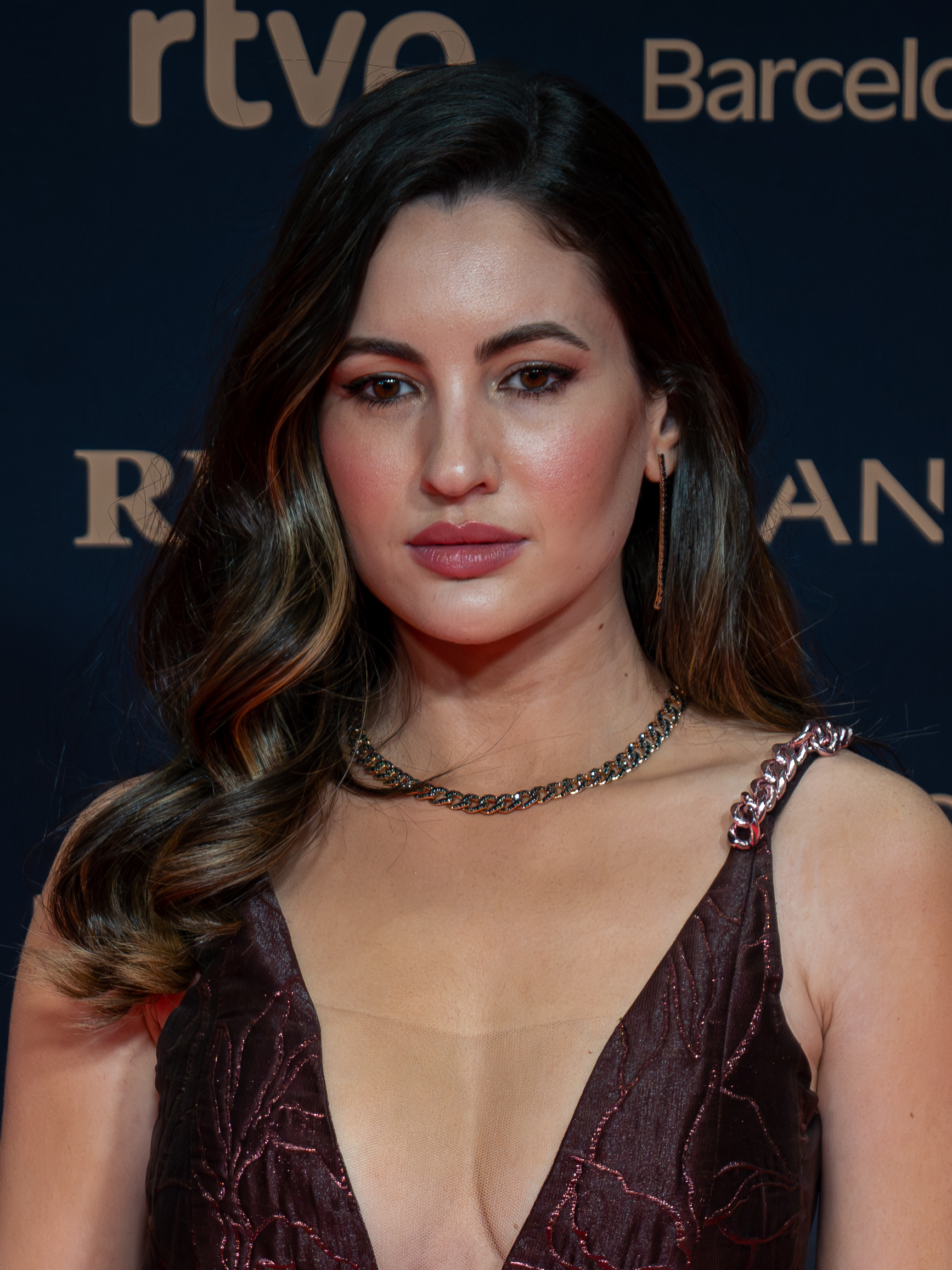
- Baquero in 2026
- Born: Ivana Baquero Macías; 11 June 1994 (age 32); Barcelona, Spain
- Education: American School of Barcelona
- Occupation: Actress

Ivana Baquero Macías (born 11 June 1994) is a Spanish actress. At the age of 11, she was chosen to star as Ofelia in Pan's Labyrinth, for which she won critical acclaim and the Goya Award for Best New Actress. In 2015, she was cast as Eretria in the television series The Shannara Chronicles.

== Early life ==
Baquero was born in Barcelona, Spain, the daughter of Iván Baquero and Julía Macías. She attended the American School of Barcelona, where she learned to speak fluent English, Spanish and Catalan. She graduated in 2012.

== Career ==
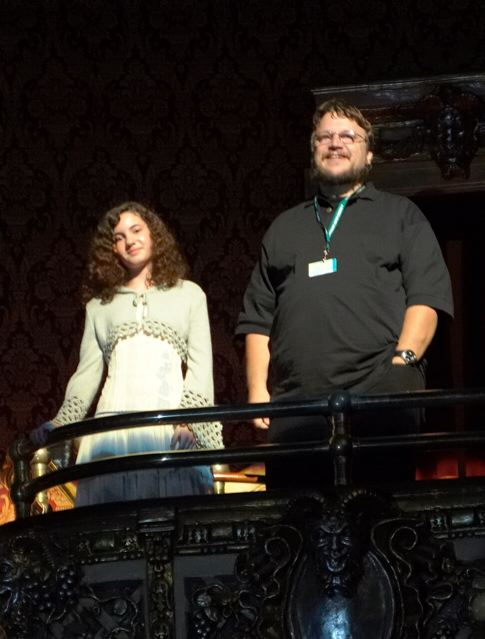
Baquero and Guillermo del Toro attending the North-American premiere of Pan's Labyrinth

Baquero started acting professionally at the age of 8, playing a few small roles in a number of films, the most notable of which is Fragile, in which she played a minor role. She was in a number of other films including Romasanta and Rottweiler. She has also appeared on Spanish television on a few occasions.

From about 1,000 young actresses, Baquero was picked to play the role of Ofelia in Pan's Labyrinth in 2006. The role of Ofelia was originally intended for a girl of the age of 8, but the script was altered to accommodate Baquero, who was 11 at the time. Afterward, she worked in various projects while still attending school.

In 2009, she played the title role in John Connolly's horror film The New Daughter, marking her first American role. In 2016, Baquero portrayed Eretria in The Shannara Chronicles, an MTV television adaptation of the Shannara novel series by Terry Brooks; its second season premiered in 2017. From 2019 to 2020, Baquero played the role of Eva Villanueva in the Netflix series High Seas and is currently a series regular in the Spartacus spinoff Spartacus: House of Ashur.

== Filmography ==
Film roles
Year	Title	Role	Notes
2004	Romasanta	Ana	
2004	Rottweiler	Esperanza	
2005	Fragile	Mandy	
2006	Pan's Labyrinth	Ofelia / Princess Moanna	Turia Award for Best New Actress; Nominated—Broadcast Film Critics Association Award for Best Young Performer; Nominated—Butaca Award for Best Catalan Film Actress (Millor actriu catalana de cinema); Nominated—Chicago Film Critics Association Award for Most Promising Performer; Nominated—Cinema Writers Circle Award for Best New Artist; Nominated—Young Artist Award for Best Performance in an International Feature Film - Leading Young Actor or Actress
2008	The Anarchist's Wife	Paloma (Age 15)	
2009	The New Daughter	Louisa James	
2013	Another Me	Kaylie	
2014	Gelo	Catarina, Joana	
2014	The Misfits Club	Meri	
2017	Sister of Mine	Aurora	
2019	Feedback	Claire	
2021	Black Friday!	Marnie	
2025	A Widow's Game	Maje	

Television roles
Year	Title	Role	Notes
2005	Maria i Assou	Nicole	Television film
2005	Películas para no dormir: Cuento de Navidad	Moni	Television film
2016–2017	The Shannara Chronicles	Eretria	Main role
2019–2020	High Seas	Eva Villanueva	Main role
2025–2026	Spartacus: House of Ashur	Messia	Main role

== Awards and nominations ==
Year	Award	Category	Work	Result	Ref.
2007	16th Actors and Actresses Union Awards	Best New Actress	Pan's Labyrinth	Won	
2007	21st Goya Awards	Best New Actress	Pan's Labyrinth	Won	
2007	Imagen Awards	Best Actress – Film	Pan's Labyrinth	Won	
2007	Premio ACE Awards	Best New Actress	Pan's Labyrinth	Won	
2007	33rd Saturn Awards	Best Performance by a Younger Actor	Pan's Labyrinth	Won	
2017	6th Sophia Awards	Best Actress	Gelo	Nominated	
2017	Zonazine Silver Biznaga	Best Actress	Demonios tus ojos	Won	
