= Stewart Till =

British businessman

Stewart Till, CBE (born 1951) was the chairman and chief executive of United International Pictures from 2002 to 2006. He is a graduate of the University of Bath.

Till started his career with advertising agency Saatchi & Saatchi in 1979. He became managing director of the UK division of CBS/Fox Video and left in November 1988 to become deputy managing director of Sky Television and head of Sky Movies. He later became deputy managing director of British Sky Broadcasting's movie channels. He joined PolyGram Filmed Entertainment in January 1992 as President of its international distribution arm before joining Universal Pictures International (UPI), where he became president and one of the most important film people in London. He left UPI in 2000 when it was closed down and became an executive director of Redbus Film Group. He became chairman and chief executive at UIP in 2002. After leaving UIP in 2006, he became Chairman of Icon Productions UK and then became CEO of Sonar Entertainment in 2012.

During the 1980s, he was chairman of the British Videogram Association. In 1999, he was appointed vice chairman of the new UK Film Council. He became chairman after Alan Parker left.

In May 2006, he became chairman of Millwall F.C.. He was succeeded by John Berylson in October 2007 and became vice-chairman.

In July 2006 he was awarded an honorary doctorate by the University of Essex.
