= Brew =

Brew may refer to:

== People ==
- Brew (surname)
- Margery Brews, 15th-century Valentine author

== Computing ==
- Binary Runtime Environment for Wireless (Brew or BREW), a development platform for mobile phones created by Qualcomm
- brew command used by the package management software Homebrew

== Organizations ==
- Brew House Association, an artistic collective on the south side of Pittsburgh
- Business Resource Efficiency and Waste programme, part of the UK government's Department for Environment, Food and Rural Affairs

== Slang terms ==
- A slang term for coffee
- A slang term for beer
- Northern English slang for a cup of tea
- "Brew up", a term of British origin for the loss of a tank by a catastrophic kill

== Other ==
- Brew (horse), a Melbourne Cup winner in 2000
- Drip brew, a method for brewing coffee
- The Brew (band), a British rock band
- The Brew (brand), the brand name of a Classic Rock music format

== See also ==
- Brewing (disambiguation)
- Broo (disambiguation)
- Homebrew (disambiguation)
- Iron Brew (disambiguation)
- Mount Brew (disambiguation), several mountains in British Columbia, Canada
- The Brew (disambiguation)
- True Brew (disambiguation)
- Witches Brew (disambiguation)
