= Brew (surname) =

Brew is a surname. Notable people with the surname include:

- Aled Brew (born 1986), Welsh rugby union player
- Bill Brew (1918–1941), Australian rugby league footballer
- Charlotte Brew, British equestrian
- Chartres Brew (1815–1870), Canadian judge
- Chloe Brew (born 1995), British rower
- Derrick Brew (born 1977), American sprinter
- Dorian Brew (born 1974), American football player
- Francis Brew (cricketer) (1903–1974), Australian cricketer
- Frank Brew (1927–2020), Australian rules footballer
- George G. Brew (1868–1937), member of the Wisconsin State Assembly
- Helen Brew (1922–2013), New Zealand actress, filmmaker and educator
- John Brew (born 1938), Australian businessman
- Josephine Macalister Brew (1904–1957), British educator
- Kate Brew Vaughn (1873–1933), American author and teacher
- Kwesi Brew (1928–2007), Ghanaian poet and diplomat
- Nathan Brew (born 1982), Welsh rugby union player
- Neil Brew (born 1979), New Zealand rugby union player
- Paul Brew (born 1965), British swimmer
- Rama Brew, Ghanaian actress
- Ray Brew (1903–1979), Australian rules footballer and coach
- Robin Brew (born 1962), British swimmer
- Thomkins Brew, Irish resident magistrate

== See also ==
- Brew (disambiguation)
