= Bure =

Bure may refer to:

== Places ==
=== Belgium ===
- Bure, Wallonia, Belgium, a small village in the Tellin municipality
- Battle of Bure, a World War II battle during the Battle of the Bulge

=== Eritrea and Ethiopia ===
- Bure (disputed zone), on the border between Eritrea and Ethiopia, claimed by both countries
- Bure, Gojjam (woreda), a woreda (district) in the Amhara Region, Ethiopia
  - Bure (Gojjam), Ethiopia, a town
- Bure, Oromia (woreda), a woreda (district) in the Oromia Region, Ethiopia
  - Bure, Illubabor, a town

=== France ===
- Bure, Meuse, a commune in the Meuse department in Grand Est, hosting the Meuse/Haute Marne Underground Research Laboratory
- Bure, Moselle a village in the French département of Moselle
- Buré, a commune in the French département of Orne

=== Italy ===
- Bure (stream), a stream in Tuscany

=== Sweden ===
- Bure River, a river in Sweden

=== Switzerland ===
- Bure, Switzerland, a municipality in the Canton of Jura

=== United Kingdom ===
- River Bure, a river in Norfolk
- HM Prison Bure, Scottow, Norfolk

== Other uses ==
- Bure (diocese), a titular see of the Roman Catholic Church in Tunisia
- Bure (surname)
- Bure (cloth)
- Bure (Fiji), the Fijian word for a wood-and-straw hut
- Bure language, an Afro-Asiatic language

== See also ==
- Boeree
- Bourret (disambiguation)
- Brue (disambiguation)
- Búri, or Buri, the first god in Norse mythology
