= Bourret (surname) =

Bourret is a surname. Notable people with the surname include:

- Alex Bourret (born 1986), Canadian ice hockey player
- Amy Bourret (1962–2015), American attorney and author
- Andrée-Anne Dupuis-Bourret (born 1978), Canadian artist
- Caprice Bourret (born 1971), American socialite and media personality
- Christophe Bourret (born 1967), French businessman and amateur racing driver
- Édouard Bourret (1913–1943), French resistance fighter
- Étienne de Bourret (died 1325), French clergyman and bishop of Paris
- Gaston Bourret (1875–1917), French doctor and bacteriologist
- Jean-Claude Bourret (born 1941), French journalist
- Jean-Marc Bourret (born 1957), French rugby league and rugby union player
- Joan Liffring-Zug Bourret (1929–2022), American photographer, book publisher and civil rights activist
- Johan Bourret (born 1971), French writer
- Joseph Bourret (1802–1859), Canadian lawyer, banker and politician
- Joseph-Christian-Ernest Bourret (1827–1896), French churchman, bishop and cardinal
- Marie Bourret (born 1982), French rugby union player
- Mathieu Bourret, Canadian pianist and composer
- Matthieu Bourret (born 1985), French rugby union player
- Noël Bourret (1755–1803), French clockmaker and businessman
- Philippe Bourret (born 1979), Canadian badminton player
- René Léon Bourret (1884–1957), French geologist and zoologist
- Victor Bourret (1877–1949), French general and military administrator

== See also ==
- Bourret (disambiguation)
