= Brue (disambiguation) =

Brue is a village on the Isle of Lewis in the Outer Hebrides, Scotland.

Brue may also refer to:

== People ==
- Jean-Louis Brue (1780–1832), a French general officer
- Nordahl Brue, (born 1944), an American lawyer and entrepreneur
- Matthew Brue, singer/songwriter, part of Missio (duo)
- André Brüe (1697–1702), of the second Compagnie du Sénégal

== Other uses ==
- River Brue, Somerset, England
- Brief resolved unexplained event (BRUE), a medical term in pediatrics

== See also ==
- Bure (disambiguation)
- Broo (disambiguation)
- Bru (disambiguation)
- Brue-Auriac, a commune in the Provence-Alpes-Côte d'Azur region, France
