= Bru =

Bru or BRU may refer to:

== People ==
- Bru people, an ethnic group of Laos, India, Vietnam, and Thailand
  - Bru language
- Bru or Reang, a tribe from northeast India
  - Kokborok, their Sino-Tibetan language
- Bru (surname), including a list of people with name Bru or Brú

== Places ==
- Brû, a commune in the Vosges department in Lorraine in northeastern France
- Brú, a farmstead and road junction in Vestur-Húnavatnssýsla county in northwestern Iceland
- Bru Municipality, a former municipality in the old Sogn og Fjordane county, Norway
- Bru, or Stavang, a village in Kinn Municipality in Vestland county, Norway
- Bru, Vestland, a village in Kvam Municipality in Vestland county, Norway
- Bru, Rogaland, an island and village in Stavanger Municipality in Rogaland county, Norway
- Brù or Brue, a village on the Isle of Lewis in the Outer Hebrides, Scotland
- Brunei, IOC and UNDP code BRU
- Brussels Airport, IATA airport code BRU

== Other uses ==
- Buller Rugby Football Union, a New Zealand rugby region
- Bus Riders Union (Los Angeles), a U.S. civil rights organization
- Bus Riders Union (Vancouver), a Canadian non-profit organization
- Romanian Greek Catholic Church (Romanian: Biserica Română Unită cu Roma, Greco-Catolică) (BRU)
- Babies "R" Us, a subdivision of Toys "R" Us

== See also ==
- Brao (disambiguation)
- Broo (disambiguation)
- Brue (disambiguation)
- Irn-Bru, a Scottish carbonated soft drink
- Saint Brioc, or other spellings, a 5th-century Welsh holy man
