= Vallet (surname) =

Vallet is a surname. It may refer to:

- Auguste Vallet de Viriville, (1815–1868), French archivist and historian
- Bernard Vallet (born 1954), French road bicycle racer
- Cédric Vallet (born 1971), French cross-country skier
- Edouard Vallet (1876–1929), Swiss artist.
- Francisco de Paula Vallet (1883–1947), Spanish Jesuit priest
- Frédérique Vallet-Bisson (1862–1949), French painter
- María Vallet-Regí (born 1946), Spanish inorganic chemist.
- Nicolas Vallet (1583–1642), French lutenist and composer
- Pierre Vallet (1575–1657), French botanical artist, engraver and embroidery designer
