= Abbey of Saint-Joseph de Clairval =

Benedictine abbey in Flavigny-sur-Ozerain, France

- Abbaye Saint-Joseph de Clairval
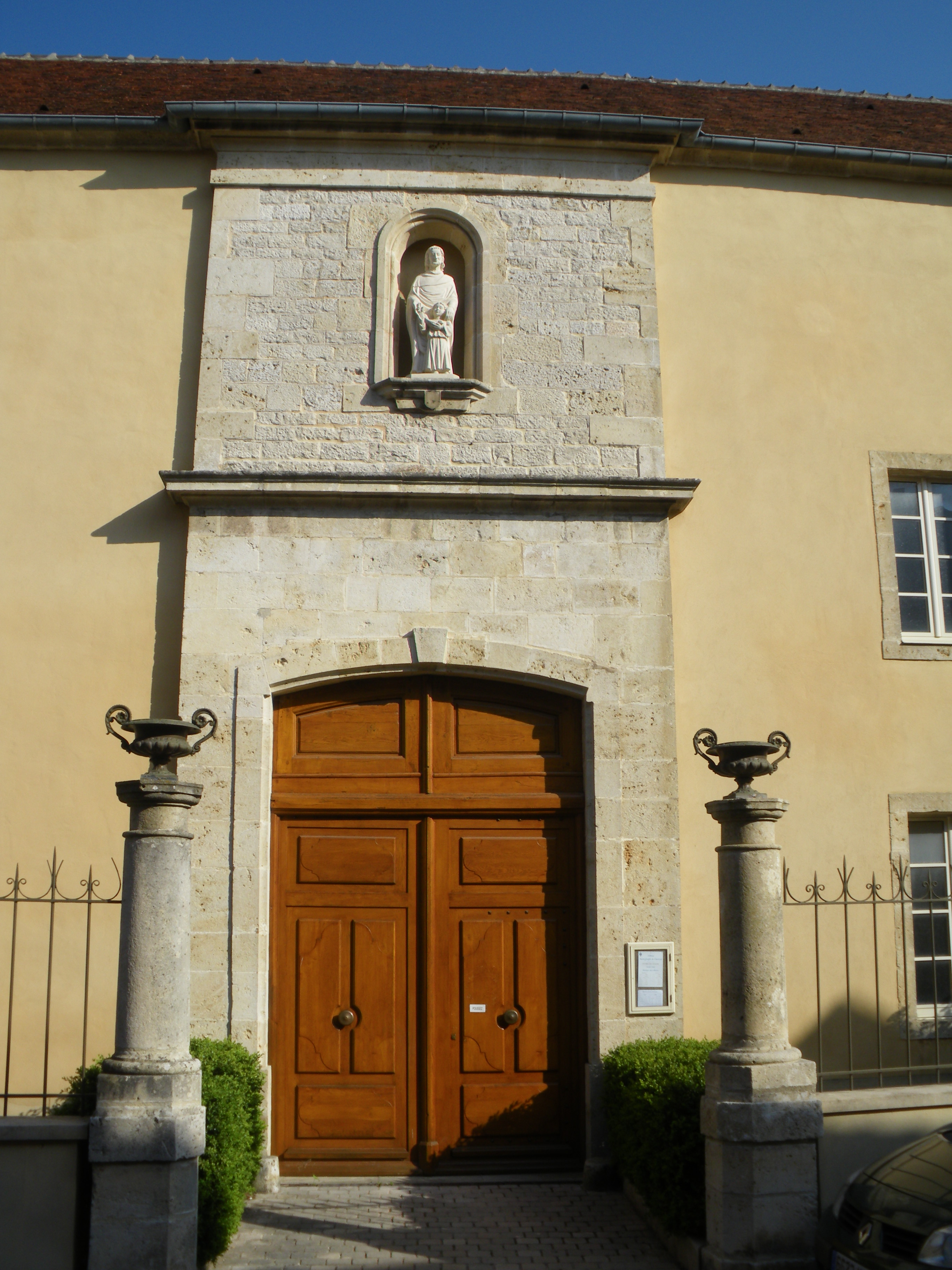

- Location within France

Monastery information
- Order: Benedictine
- Denomination: Catholic Church

Architecture
- Functional status: Former abbey
- Style: Classical
- Closed: 18th century

Site
- Location: Flavigny-sur-Ozerain, Côte-d'Or
- Country: France
- Coordinates: 47.51052°N 4.53116°E
- Website: www.clairval.com

The Abbey of Saint-Joseph de Clairval (French: Abbaye Saint-Joseph de Clairval) is a Benedictine abbey located in Flavigny-sur-Ozerain, in the Côte d'Or department. Founded in 1972, the abbey has no direct relationship with the Flavigny Abbey, which has not been occupied by Benedictine monks since the French Revolution. Belonging to the Olivetan branch, the monks wear the black bure and the white collar.

== History ==
Saint-Joseph de Clairval was founded in 1972 by Dom Augustin-Marie Joly in Clairval, Switzerland. The abbey moved to Flavigny in 1976, since the owner wanting to recover the buildings in Clairval. In memory of this period, the community kept the name of Clairval. The premises used by the abbey in Flavigny were originally built in 1700 as the private mansion of the Marquis de Souhey, governor of Flavigny. They had been occupied by the Diocesan Petit Séminaire.

At first the monks of Flavigny celebrated the Tridentine Mass that Pope Pius V and Archbishop Marcel Lefebvre had ordained for their priests. However, the community never had canonical links with the Society of Saint Pius X. From the mid-1980s, rumors announcing the ordination of four bishops without the agreement of Rome gradually led the community to move away from the Lefebvriste movement.

Contacts were established with the Diocese of Dijon and the community was recognized as a monastery under diocesan law on 2 February 1988. At the request of the Holy See, in 1992 the monastery was erected into an abbey and the founder, Dom Augustin Marie Joly, became abbot. As of 2010 there were about fifty monks. In June 2021 it was announced that the abbey had founded a priory which would take over the premises of Solignac Abbey. Starting in the fall of that year about ten monks would settle in Solignac. It would take about twelve years for the foundation to be recognized as final.

== Liturgy ==
At the request of the bishop of Dijon, the conventual mass is today celebrated according to the ordinary form of the Roman Rite, in Latin and ad Orientem (in fact towards the southeast). The conventual mass being not concelebrated, the monk priests celebrate every day the low mass, mostly in the Tridentine form of the Roman Rite. All the offices (including the Liturgy of the Hours) are sung in Gregorian chant.

== Spiritual exercises of Saint Ignatius and individual visits ==
Since its foundation and faithful to its own spirit, the abbey has regularly offered retreats for men where they undertake the Spiritual Exercises of Ignatius of Loyola. These retreats generally take place over five days, according to the method of Father Francisco de Paula Vallet (1883–1947).

Men can also make individual visits in the abbey outside of retreat time. They then participate in the liturgical life of the community and can benefit from spiritual accompaniment.

== Spiritual letter ==
Every five weeks, the abbey writes a spiritual letter in six languages. It can be received free of charge by e-mail or post by registering on the abbey's website. It is generally a life of a saint.

== Other activities ==
The monks create liturgical artwork including iconography and sculpture. For income, the abbey gift shop, Traditions Monastiques, offers:

- Publications
- Manufacture of icons and diptychs / triptychs
- Editions of the Monastic Traditions
- Stone carving workshop.

== Abbots ==
- Dom Augustin-Marie Joly (1917–2006), 1992-1993.
- Dom Antoine-Marie Beauchef, (administrator from 1993 to 1998), 1998 - 2019.
- Father Barthélémy-Marie de Ruffray, administrator from 2019 to 2020.
- Dom Jean-Bernard Marie Bories, since May 8, 2020.

== Religious neighbors ==
The Saint-Curé-d'Ars seminary, one of the seminaries of the Society of Saint Pius X, is located in Flavigny on the other side of the village.

== Gallery ==
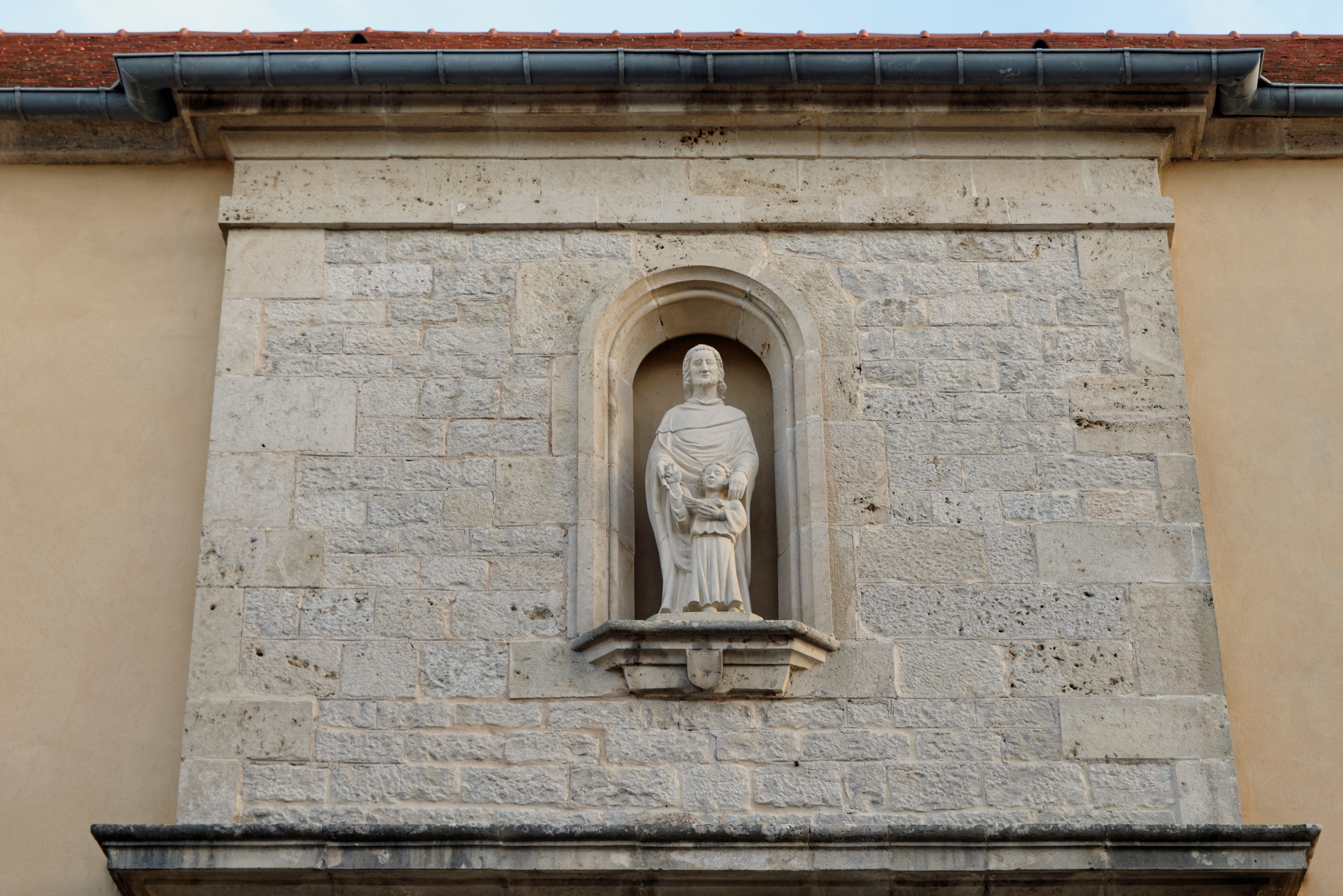
Statue au-dessus de la porte

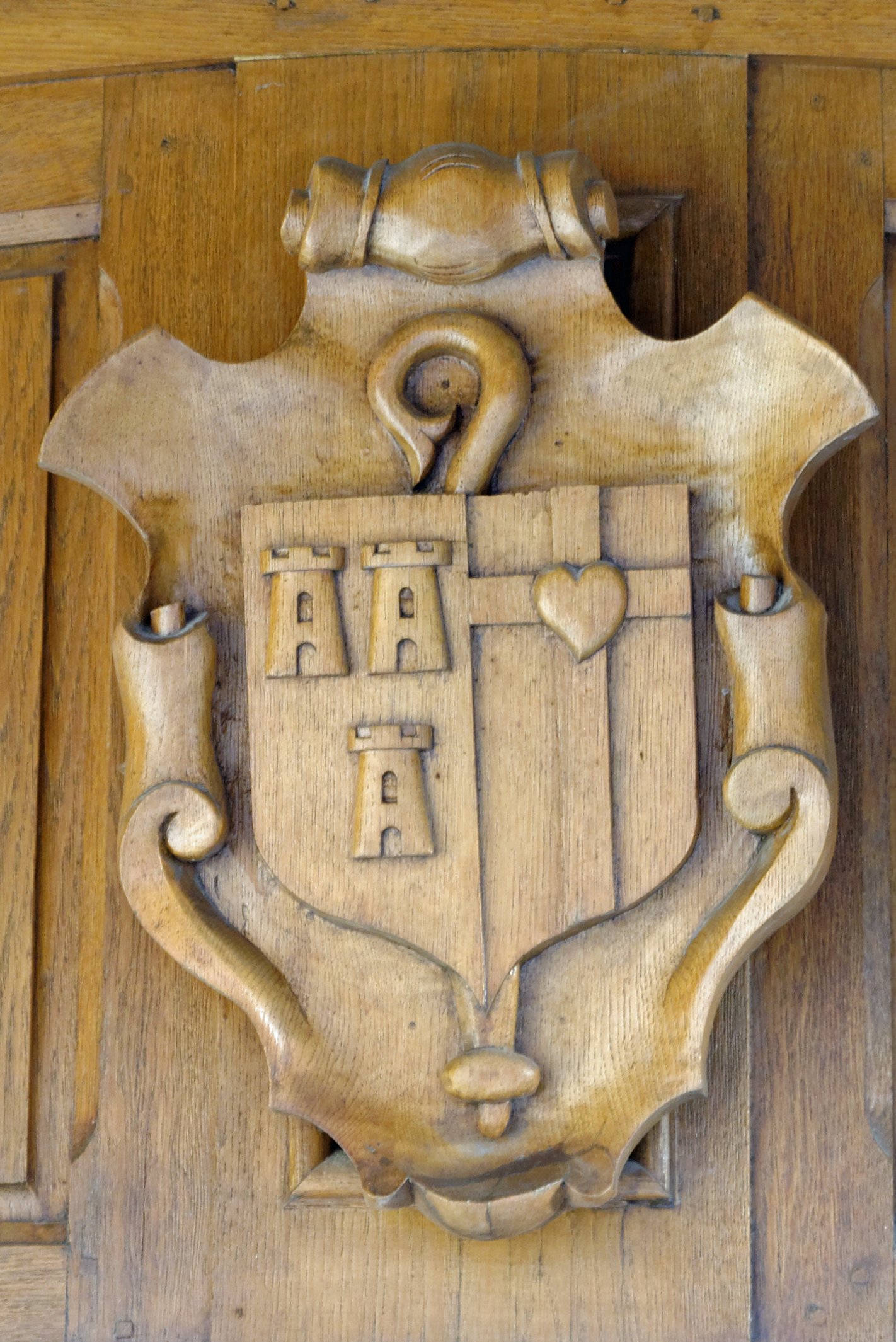
Blason de l'Abbé fondateur Dom Augustin Marie Joly

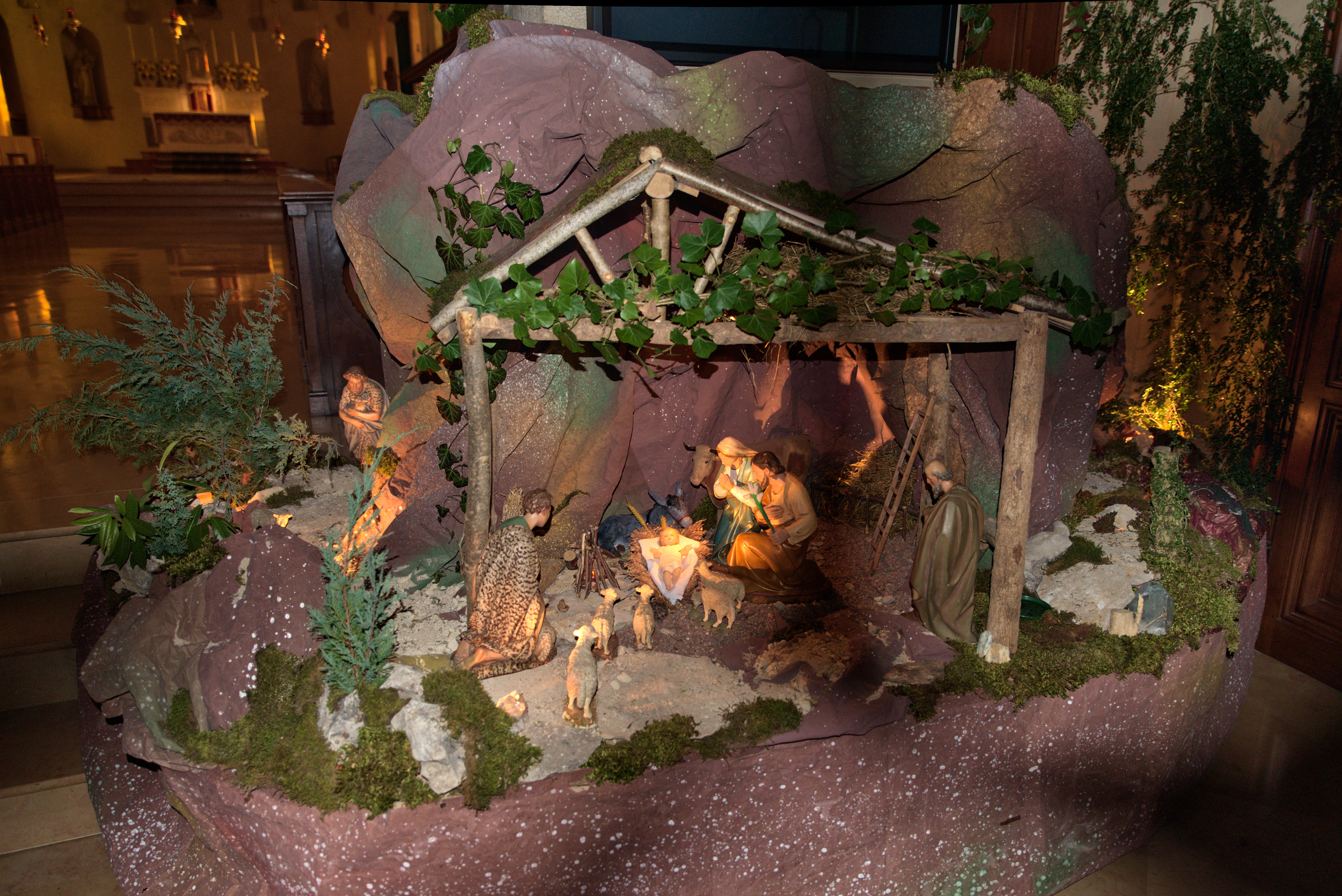
Crèche de Noel

== Sources ==
- "Communiqué" (PDF), clairval.com (in French), Monastère Saint-Joseph de Clairval, 8 February 2019
- "Des moines fondent un prieuré à l'abbaye de Solignac", Le Populaire du Centre, 11 June 2021
- Flavigny-sur-Ozerain, Office de Tourisme Semur
- History, Abbey of Saint-Joseph de Clairval
- "L'abbaye Saint-Joseph de Clairval a élu son nouvel abbé", diocese-dijon.com (in French), Diocèse de Dijon, 11 May 2020
- Liturgy, Abbey of Saint-Joseph de Clairval
- "Religious items shop", Traditions Monastiques, Abbaye saint Joseph de Clairval
- Tribe, Shawn (25 April 2010), Abbaye Saint-Joseph de Clairval, Flavigny-sur-Ozerain, France, New Liturgical Movement
