= Bru (surname) =

Bru or Brú is the surname of the following people

- Antonio Brú (born 1962), Spanish theoretical physicist
- Claudio López Bru (1853–1925), Spanish businessman
- Federico Laredo Brú (1875–1946), President of Cuba from 1936 to 1940
- Francisco Bru (1885–1962), Spanish footballer, referee and manager
- Heðin Brú (1901–1987), pen name of the Faroese novelist and translator Hans Jacob Jacobsen
- Jon Bru (born 1977), Spanish professional road bicycle racer
- Jonathan Bru (born 1985), Mauritian international footballer
- Jørgen Bru (1881–1974), Norwegian sport shooter
- Kévin Bru (born 1988), French-born Mauritian footballer
- Luis Bru (1907–?), Spanish boxer
- Luis Ortega Bru (1916–1982), Spanish sculptor and carver
- Mosen Vicente Bru (1682–1703), Spanish painter
- Myriam Bru (born 1932), French actress
- Raymond Bru (1906–1989), Belgian fencer
- Roser Bru (1923–2021), Spanish-Chilean painter and engraver
- Salvador Bru, Spanish painter
- Tina Bru (born 1986), Norwegian politician
- Vincent Bru (born 1955), French politician
- Yannick Bru (born 1973), French rugby union coach and former player
