= Ronan Burke =

Irish hurler

Personal information
- Native name: Rónán de Búrca (Irish)
- Born: 3 June 1990 (age 36) Turloughmore, Ireland
- Height: 1.81 m (5 ft 11 in)

Sport
- Sport: Hurling
- Position: Full Back
Club
- Years: Club
- Turloughmore
Inter-county
- Years: County
- 2014–: Galway
Inter-county titles
- Leinster titles: 2
- All-Irelands: 1
- NHL: 1

Ronan Burke (born 3 June 1990) is an Irish hurler who, as of 2017, was playing full-back for the Galway senior team.

On 3 September 2017, Burke was a non playing substitute for Galway as they won their first All-Ireland Senior Hurling Championship in 29 years against Waterford.
