= Brewing (disambiguation) =

Brewing is the commercial production of beer.

Brewing may also refer to:

- Homebrewing, the non-commercial production of beer
- Tea brewing
- Coffee brewing
- Soy sauce brewing
- Steeping, the soaking of a solid in a liquid
- Decoction, the production of liquid extracts by boiling solid materials

== See also ==
- Brew (disambiguation)
