= Wizard at Large =

1988 novel by Terry Brooks

- Book cover
- Author: Terry Brooks
- Language: English language
- Series: Magic Kingdom of Landover
- Genre: Fantasy novel
- Publisher: Del Rey Books
- Publication date: October 1988
- Publication place: United States
- Media type: Print (hardback & paperback)
- Pages: 320 pp
- ISBN: 0-345-36227-6
- OCLC: 20212750
- Preceded by: The Black Unicorn
- Followed by: The Tangle Box

Wizard At Large by Terry Brooks is the third novel of the Magic Kingdom of Landover series, following The Black Unicorn. Written in 1988, the plot has Abernathy accidentally transported to Earth by one of Questor's ill-conceived spells, while a demonic imp is unleashed upon the kingdom of Landover. It was the last of a trilogy of annual Landover novels until The Tangle Box was published six years later. The book was re-released as part of a Landover omnibus in 2009.

== Plot ==
In an attempt to return Abernathy to his former human self, court wizard Questor Thews inadvertently sends the canine court scribe, along with Ben Holiday's royal medallion, to Earth. Specifically, Abernathy ends up with the medallion in the menagerie of Michel Ard Rhi, a cruel former prince of Landover who was banished from Landover years ago. Ard Rhi is now a Washington state millionaire who keeps a collection of rare and magical items in his personal castle. As part of the botched spell, Abernathy is exchanged for one of Ard Rhi's magical artifacts, and a strange bottle appears in Landover in Abernathy's place. The bottle contains a Darkling, a creature similar to an evil genie that corrupts its master.

The bottle is stolen by the G'home Gnomes Filip and Sot, and Ben gives chase along with Questor, Willow, and Bunion. Ben and Willow later decide to use Questor's magic to travel to Earth to find Abernathy. With the help of Miles, Ben's old law partner, and Elizabeth, the daughter of one of Ard Rhi's employees, Abernathy is rescued, but Ard Rhi uses his influence to have the party detained at a police station.

Meanwhile, Questor continues to pursue the Darkling. He finds that through a series of thefts, the bottle has ended up in the hands of the evil witch Nightshade. Knowing that only the High Lord can defeat Nightshade, Questor decides to try to convince the dragon Strabo to fly him through the fairy mists to Earth. Using an itch spell, Questor gets the dragon to agree. They arrive at the last moment to rescue Ben and his friends from the police station and fly them back to Landover, but not before Questor uses his magic to restore Ard Rhi's conscience and convince him to give away his vast estate.

Ben and Questor confront Nightshade, and Ben uses his medallion to summon his knight champion, the Paladin. Nightshade, however, uses the Darkling to conjure a perverse version of the Paladin, and the creations give battle. Questor, meanwhile, manages to shrink himself and act as a stopper in the Darkling's bottle, cutting off the source of its power. The Darkling is destroyed, Nightshade flees, and order is restored to Landover.
