= Brao =

Brao or BRAO may refer to:

- Brao language, a Mon–Khmer language of Cambodia and Laos
- Brao people, an ethnic minority in Cambodia and Laos
- BRAO, Branch retinal artery occlusion, a rare eye vascular disorder where a branch of the central retinal artery is obstructed

== See also ==
- Bru (disambiguation)
