= The Brew =

The Brew may refer to:

- Craig Brewster, former professional footballer
- The Brew (band), British blues and rock band
- The Brew (brand), a common branding for classic rock radio stations owned by Clear Channel Communications in the United States
- W249AR, 97.7 the Brew, an adult hits radio station licensed to Asheville, North Carolina, United States
