= Mothers and Other Liars =

- Author: Amy Bourret
- Language: English
- Publisher: St. Martin's Griffin
- Publication date: 3 August 2010
- Publication place: United States
- Media type: Print (Paperback)
- Pages: 288 pp (first edition, paperback)
- ISBN: 0312586582

Mothers and Other Liars is the debut novel from Amy Bourret. It is about a woman who finds an abandoned baby at a rest stop and decides to raise the child as her own. The book was published in August 2010 by St. Martin's Griffin.

== Plot ==
The story focuses on Ruby Leander, a nineteen-year-old runaway, who finds a baby in the trash at an Oklahoma rest stop. She makes a split-second decision to take the child as her own, rescuing it from a life of abandonment like her own. Ten years later, she has built a life for herself and her daughter, Lark, in Santa Fe, New Mexico. She works as a manicurist and has a steady relationship with boyfriend of three years, Chaz, and is expecting his child. Ruby has told her daughter that her father died in an accident. However, she is forced to face her past when she reads an article in a magazine that shows her daughter as a missing child, thought to have been kidnapped by carjackers. She must decide whether to come clean about Lark's origins or continue to live the lie. She decides to tell Lark how she found her in a car seat dumped in a trash can, that she is not her biological mother, and that the childcare authorities were not involved in any way with her apparently illegitimate adoption.

== Development ==
The inspiration for this book came from Bourret's work with child advocacy organizations. She often wrote about lost children from a young age and it is a recurring theme in her recent work.

Bourret made a few half-hearted attempts at getting her manuscript published directly, before stowing it away. After encouragement from fellow members of a writing group, Bourret began once more trying to find an agent for her book. The manuscript was accepted by the first literary agent that read it; however, it took that agent so long to accept that Bourret had already sent the manuscript to 52 other agents, each of whom rejected it.

== Reception ==
Library Journal responded positively with a "Starred Review", and stated that "Bourret nails the character development and pacing that make a good novel compelling." Comparing Bourret to Jodi Picoult, reviewer Beth Gibbs said the novel was "perfect for summer reading".
