= Steeping =

Process of putting an object under warm water for a relatively long period of time

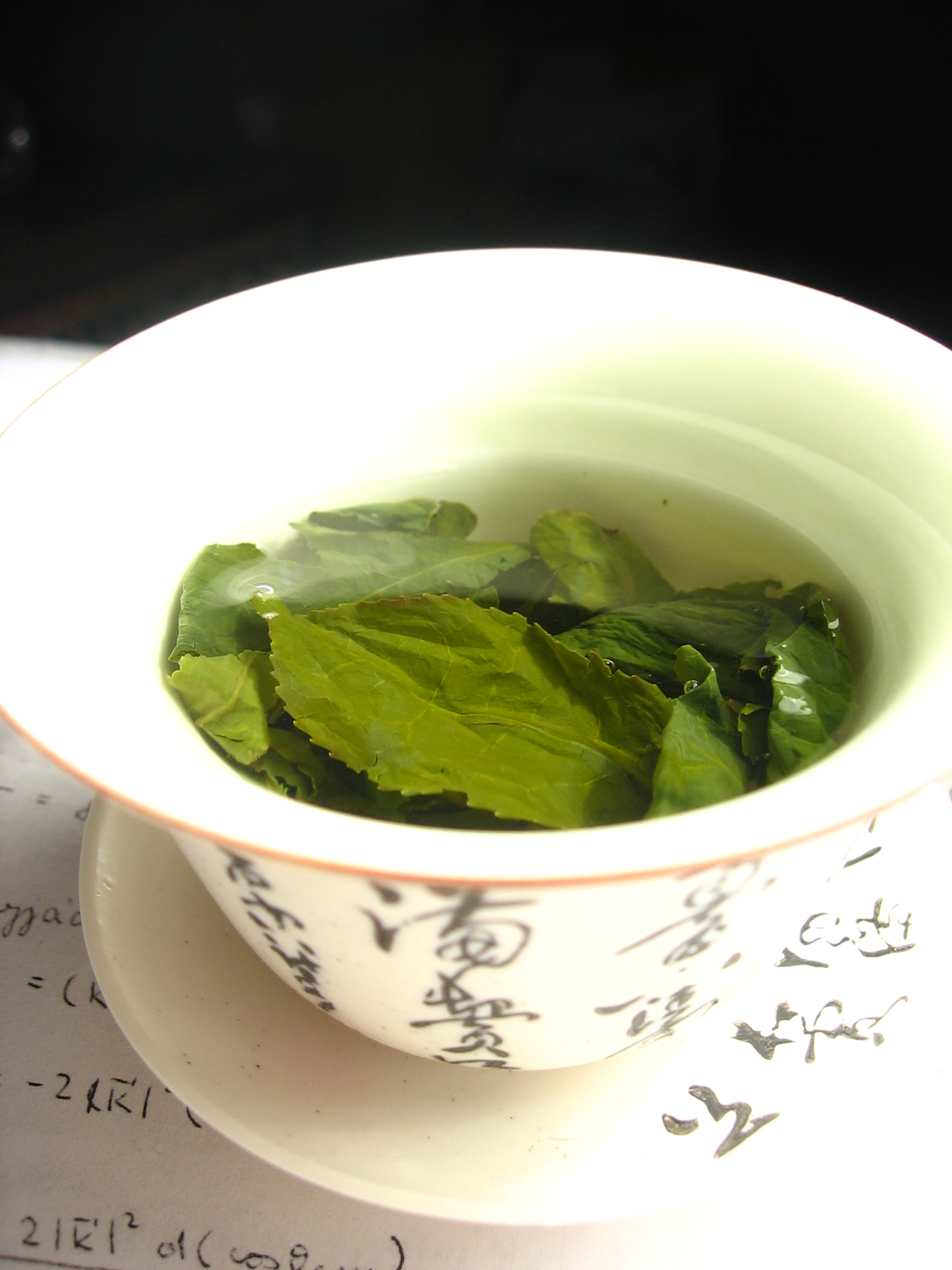
Green tea leaves steeping in a gaiwan (type of tea cup)

Steeping is the soaking of an organic solid, such as leaves or coffee granules, in a liquid (usually water) to extract flavours or to soften it. The specific process of teas being prepared for drinking by leaving the leaves in heated water to release the flavour and nutrients is known as steeping. Herbal teas may be prepared by decoction, infusion, or maceration. Some solids are soaked to remove an ingredient, such as salt, where the solute is not the desired product.

== Corn ==
One example is the steeping of corn (or maize), part of the milling process. As described by the US Corn Refiners Association, harvested kernels of corn are cleaned and then steeped in water at a temperature of 50 °C (120 °F) for 30 to 40 hours. In the process their moisture content rises from 15% to 45% and their volume more than doubles. The gluten bonds in the corn are weakened and starch is released. The corn is then ground to break free the germ and other components, and the water used (steepwater), which has absorbed various nutrients, is recycled for use in animal feeds.

== Tea ==
Dried teas as loose tea or tea bags are prepared for drinking by steeping the leaves in just boiled or heated water to release the flavour and nutrients in the dried tea into the water. This is often done in a cup, mug, teapot, pitcher or urn. A tea infuser or a tea strainer may be used to assist in this process. There is a huge variety of teas available in the market with broad based categories like oolong, green, black, white etc. and other specialized ones catering to particular regions such as Assam, Darjeeling etc. Each tea has to be prepared properly pertaining to their make and quality.

== Beer ==
Steeping grain is a part of making beer.

== See also ==
- Brewing (disambiguation)
- ISO 3103
- Malting
