= Thomkins Brew =

Irish resident magistrate

Thomkins Brew, Esq. (fl. August 1843) was an Irish resident magistrate.

Brew was assaulted while been helped by police in arresting a man engaged in rioting - "that man was McDonagh from a place called Ballyboggan" - at the Fair of Turloughmore, County Galway. This resulted in an affray in which Brew and a number of the policemen were injured. After escaping to the safety of a house owned by a family called Qualter. Their attackers ceased, and some twenty minutes later the police fired a volley of some twenty shots, which resulted in the death of a John Callaghan (murder victim) of Moycullen.

Brew and the policemen were found guilty of wilful murder. The Tuam Herald reported that

Thomkins Brew, Esq., R.M., has been suspended, pending his trial at the next Galway assizes, under the verdict of the Coroners inquest, for the murder of John Callaghan, by a gunshot inflicted by one a part of police, under the command of Mister Brew at the late fair of Turloughmore, Mister Kirwan, R.M., is to succeed Mister Brew in this district. pro tem.

But Brew was never brought to trial as he was killed in a shooting shortly after. A son, Chartres Brew (1815-70), was a gold commissioner and judge.
