= Witches Brew =

Witches Brew may refer to:

- A synonym for potion
- Witches' Brew (novel), a 1995 fantasy novel written by Terry Brooks
- Witches Brew (record label), an underground European record label
- Witches' Brew (film), a 1980 comedy/horror starring Teri Garr, Richard Benjamin, and Lana Turner
- "Witches' Brew" (song), a 2011 song by Katy B
- Witches' Brew, a song from the musical Hallelujah, Baby!
