= The Tangle Box =

1994 novel by Terry Brooks

- Book cover
- Author: Terry Brooks
- Language: English
- Series: Magic Kingdom of Landover
- Genre: Fantasy
- Publisher: Del Rey Books
- Publication date: April 12, 1994
- Publication place: United States
- Pages: 368 pp
- ISBN: 0-345-38700-7
- OCLC: 32299199
- Preceded by: Wizard at Large
- Followed by: Witches' Brew

The Tangle Box by Terry Brooks is the fourth novel of the Magic Kingdom of Landover series. This book was first published on April 12, 1994. The plot has an inept old wizard, Horris Kew, accidentally releasing an evil creature called the Gorse. The creature soon imprisons Ben, the dragon Strabo, and the witch Nightshade in a device known as the Tangle Box. They must find a way out while Ben's allies find a way to handle the new threat from the Gorse.
