= Magic Kingdom of Landover =

Fantasy fiction series by Terry Brooks

The Magic Kingdom of Landover
- The first edition cover to the first novel
- 1. Magic Kingdom for Sale—Sold!; 2. The Black Unicorn; 3. Wizard at Large; 4. The Tangle Box; 5. Witches' Brew; 6. A Princess of Landover
- Author: Terry Brooks
- Cover artist: Darrell K. Sweet
- Country: United States
- Language: English
- Discipline: Fantasy
- Publisher: Del Rey Books
- Published: 1986–present
- Media type: Print (hardcover and paperback)
- No. of books: 6

The Magic Kingdom of Landover is a series of six fantasy novels by Terry Brooks following the adventures of a former trial lawyer named Ben Holiday, who purchases a magical kingdom.

The novels are set in a fictional world known as Landover that is populated with numerous magical and fairy creatures. Its name is a reference to the song "Over the Rainbow" from The Wizard of Oz and the lyrics (Somewhere over the rainbow, way up high, There's a land that I heard of once in a lullaby). Landover is described as a small world, surrounded on all sides by fairy mists which connect it to many other worlds, including Earth. Landover is a rural kingdom, populated by humans, gnomes, kobolds, and various other fantasy creatures, all of whom speak the fictional language of "Landoverian" – which the protagonist can speak through magical means – and who often form separate societies. Their rulers, while answerable to the king, are allowed a certain degree of autonomy. Also inhabiting the land are the characters of Strabo, a dragon, and the witch Nightshade.

Landover is protected by the Paladin, a magical knight who is a projection of its rulers. In the absence of a worthy ruler, the Paladin disappears, and Landover falls prey to a physical decay known as "the Tarnish", which slowly spreads from the king's castle (Sterling Silver) to the rest of the kingdom. The Paladin is one of the few magics in the land that can stand up against that of Strabo or Nightshade.

== The books ==
=== Magic Kingdom for Sale—Sold! (1986) ===
The first novel is about the main character, Ben Holiday, and his discovery of an ad offering the kingship of a magic kingdom named Landover. He is soon crowned king but must deal with a host of problems to solidify his throne.

=== The Black Unicorn (1987) ===
In the second novel, Holiday is disguised, supposedly by magic used by the evil wizard Meeks. He must figure out how to restore himself to the throne, meanwhile saving Willow in her dangerous quest to find the Black Unicorn.

=== Wizard at Large (1988) ===
The third novel tells of Abernathy being accidentally transported to Earth by one of Questor's ill-conceived spells. Meanwhile, a demonic imp is unleashed upon Landover; Ben and his friends must find a way to get back Abernathy and stop the evil creature.

=== The Tangle Box (1994) ===
An inept conjurer/conman, Horris Kew, accidentally releases upon Landover an evil creature called the Gorse. The creature soon imprisons Ben, the dragon Strabo, and the witch Nightshade in a device known as the Tangle Box. They must find a way out while Ben's allies find a way to handle the new threat from the Gorse.

=== Witches' Brew (1995) ===
A usurper who claims to be from another world calls for Ben's abdication from the throne, and begins to send evil, magic creatures against him. Meanwhile, Nightshade kidnaps Ben and Willow's daughter, Mistaya, in a dangerous attempt to subvert her and use her innate magic. Meanwhile, Questor and Abernathy are stuck back in Earth to meet up with an old friend, leaving Ben and Willow alone to deal with the new threat.

=== A Princess of Landover (2009) ===
Ben Holiday, Chicago lawyer and mere mortal turned monarch of enchanted Landover, has grappled with scheming barons, fire-breathing beasts, diabolical conjurers, and extremely wicked witches. None of whom have prepared him for the most daunting of challengers: a teenage daughter. Sent by Ben and his beloved sylph bride, Willow, to an exclusive girls' prep school, headstrong (and half-magical) Mistaya Holiday has found life in the natural world a less-than-perfect fit. When her latest rebellious antics get her indefinitely suspended, she's determined to resume her real education – learning sorcery from court wizard Questor Thews – whether her parents like it or not.

Back home in Landover, Mistaya's frustrated father is just as determined that the precocious princess learn some responsibility, and he declares her grounded until she successfully refurbishes the long-forsaken royal library. Mortified by the prospect of salvaging a king's ransom in moldy books – and horrified by the word that the repulsive local nobleman Lord Laphroig seeks to marry her – Mistaya decides that the only way to run her own life is to run away from home.

== Short stories ==
In March 2021, two short stories, "An Unfortunate Influx of Filipinas" and "Don't Tell Dad", were published in the short story collection Small Magic.

== Major characters ==
=== Ben Holiday ===
Once a successful trial lawyer in Chicago, Ben's life takes a dramatic change when his wife Annie and their unborn child are killed in a traffic accident. Ben sinks into depression and no longer gains fulfillment through the law firm he established with his best friend, Miles Bennett. Seeing a Christmas catalog advertising a fairytale kingdom for sale, he purchases it for $1,000,000 in a desperate hope to find something meaningful again. The kingdom, called Landover, turns out to be real and in need of a true king to restore it to its previous splendor. Ben is challenged at every step by a number of characters, all with seemingly different motives. He is eventually able to gain the respect of the citizens of Landover and establish himself as the true High Lord.

=== Questor Thews ===
Questor is the court magician, and one of Ben's most trusted friends and advisors. He is the half-brother of the wizard Meeks, though Questor has taken a different path in his life, choosing to serve Landover and its king, rather than trying to control them. Frequently described by Ben as looking like a "scarecrow", with "patchwork robes", Questor's command of his magic is somewhat questionable, as his spells frequently backfire or have unintended consequences. Questor was responsible for transforming Abernathy into a Wheaten Terrier to disguise him from Michel Ard Rhi, the old king's son, but has not been able to turn him back. Despite his many mistakes, he has fought with the dragon Strabo and come out the victor (if only once, due to an emergency, and winning via a non-ending itch; this was, however, after a fair amount of fighting beforehand, including quite an ice storm that he summoned upon Strabo, and some rather odd misfires, such as a rain of flowers).

=== Meeks ===
Meeks is the half-brother of Questor, and the one responsible for selling Ben the magic kingdom. He appears as a grizzled old man missing his right arm and is in fact a powerful wizard. Meeks came into possession of the medallion that identifies the kings of Landover and developed a scheme to repeatedly sell the kingdom with it. A buyer would purchase the medallion for access to Landover, and then when the victim either abandoned the kingship as too difficult or was killed, Meeks would retrieve the medallion and re-sell the kingdom. His plans were thwarted by Ben Holiday when Ben was able to successfully claim lordship of Landover and cut Meeks off from the kingdom.

=== Abernathy ===
Abernathy is the court scribe, and one of Ben's closest friends. Questor Thews turned Abernathy into a Wheaten Terrier, previous to Ben Holiday's arrival, to escape the cruelties of the old king's son. Questor however did not possess enough magical knowledge to return Abernathy to his human form, and Abernathy has not let Questor forget that fact. As the scribe, Abernathy is responsible for the day-to-day business at the castle, a task he excels at through his studious and thorough nature. Abernathy's natural tendency to be overcautious helps to balance the impetuousness of Ben, and the unpreparedness of Questor.

=== Willow ===
Willow is a sylph and Ben's wife. She is the daughter of the River Master and a wood elemental, giving her pale-green skin and emerald hair. Her dual nature is reflected in the fact that she must transform into a Willow tree once every 21 days to maintain her life force. She has a tense and distant relationship with her father, as her existence serves as a permanent reminder to him of the brief relationship that he desires to reclaim, but never can. It is to her mother that she turns for guidance.

=== Mistaya ===
The daughter of Ben and Willow, who, in The Princess of Landover, took over her father's role as the main protagonist. Growing magically fast into a teenager, she wants nothing to do with her father's plans to give her a normal childhood and a grounding in reality, preferring instead a life of magic and adventure. This repeatedly gets her into trouble. The magical creatures of Landover often come to her rescue, as they believe she has a great and miraculous destiny ahead of her.

=== Bunion and Parsnip ===
Bunion and Parsnip are two kobolds who live in the castle and carry out the day-to-day chores. They act as groundskeeper and cook respectively, and are also competent fighters and bodyguards. Their appearance is similar to large-eared monkeys with mouths full of sharp teeth. They do not speak, but instead communicate through gestures, hisses and other vocalizations. The kobolds are fairy creatures that had come out of the mists surrounding Landover and have pledged their lives to the service of the throne of Landover.

=== Fillip and Sot ===
Fillip and Sot are G'home Gnomes and brothers. Nigh inseparable, they always travel together and become semi-frequent companions of Ben's. Being incorrigible thieves, G'home Gnomes are considered pests by the majority of Landover's community, but once Ben was able to prove his kingship, Fillip and Sot have proved loyal to him, if a bit of a nuisance. They have a tendency to trade on their relationship with Ben to circumvent the standard legal process and take their innumerable complaints directly to Ben himself.

The G'home Gnomes earned their tribal name at some unspecified point in Landover's past. When they first arrived, and the residents of Landover had learned of their kleptomaniac tendencies, members of the tribe were met with the wish/phrase "Go home, Gnome" by the general populace, expressing the general wish that they would all go home to wherever it was they came from. Over time this got abbreviated to "G'home Gnome" and eventually the wish became the name by which the tribe was known.

=== River Master ===
The River Master is the lord of the Lake Country and the fairy folk that live in Elderew. He was originally a creature of fairy, but now lives apart from the mists. He is a gifted healer, and by his magic the Lake Country is kept healthy while the rest of Landover succumbs to the Tarnish. He is Willow's father, though their relationship is strained. He yearns to possess Willow's mother, a wood sprite, but cannot. This, combined with the fact that Willow will go to her mother and not him when she needs help, has resulted in a very cool relationship between father and daughter.

=== Nightshade ===
Nightshade is a powerful witch who lives in the Deep Fell. She is one of the primary antagonists to Ben, along with Strabo the dragon. She possesses great magic, since she is from the fairy world, but has always used that power for greed and torture, which was why she was cast out of the mists and forbidden reentry. Later in the series she is sent to Earth by Haltwhistle the Mud-Puppy in defense of Mistaya. In crow form she is trapped in an aviary, but mysteriously disappears at the end of the latest novel.

=== Strabo ===
Strabo is a dragon who lives in the desolate Fire Springs region. He is a solitary creature, the last of his kind, and is a frequent rival to Ben in his duties as king. He is one of the few powerful creatures of magic in the valley, along with Nightshade, although in Tangle Box and Witches' Brew he has proved to be not as evil as Nightshade. He is honorable in his word. He has the ability to fly through the fairy mists into other worlds, such as Earth, and is fond of Willow's singing voice.

=== The Paladin ===
The Paladin is the king's champion and defender. His image is engraved on the medallion of the kings, and only a true king can summon the Paladin to fight for him. In truth, the Paladin is the spirit of an immortal warrior that resides within the medallion and is channeled through the king when needed. The secret of the Paladin is known only to the king of Landover, but in the latter parts of Witches' Brew, Ben confesses to Willow the relationship between himself and the Paladin.

== Minor characters ==
- The Iron Mark is the leader of the demons of Abaddon. He appears to be human in shape, yet he stands at least eight feet tall. Whenever he is seen he is totally covered in black armor with serpents carved on it. The armor is scarred and battered, with serrated spines running down the Mark's limbs and back. His helmet has a death's head, and through its slits can be seen his eyes glimmering a bright crimson. He carries many weapons, and the severed heads of his enemies hang about his neck. He rides a winged demon that appears to be half snake and half wolf.

The demons of Abaddon are exiled from the fairy world, and would like to return to it. The only way for them to do so is through Landover, making them feel the need to conquer it. Before the coming of Ben Holiday, the Mark had proclaimed himself King of Landover, and repeatedly challenged the holders of the medallion to single combat. Since his defeat by Ben Holiday and the Paladin he has refused to openly fight against them again.

- Earth Mother is a creature of fairy and the personification of nature in Landover. She briefly intervenes during the events of The Black Unicorn to point Ben in the right direction to find Willow. She recognizes an importance in the relationship between the two and makes Ben promise that he will protect Willow above all else.
- Edgewood Dirk is a fairy creature known as a Prism Cat, appearing as an ordinary cat but with the ability to speak, and to refocus light and energy through its body. When Ben is tricked by Meeks into believing he has lost the medallion and control of the kingdom, Dirk is sent by the fairies to guide Ben toward the truth and provide a measure of protection. Dirk is aloof and makes frequent reference to the indifference of cats to the problems of the rest of the world.
- Miles Bennett: Ben's partner in his old law firm in Chicago. Miles's calm demeanor provides a balance to Ben's impetuousness and aggressiveness. Miles refers to Ben Holiday as "Doc" for his clever legal maneuvering in the courtroom, a reference to gunfighter Doc Holliday.
- Michel Ard Rhi is the son of the previous king of Landover, now deceased. He was the one who schemed with Meeks to repeatedly sell the kingdom to unwary victims. He is also indirectly the reason for Abernathy being a dog, as Questor transformed him one day to save him from Ard Rhi's wrath.
- Haltwhistle: A Mud Puppy given to Mistaya Holiday by the Earth Mother as a gift of protection. He features quite briefly, though his actions are important to the plots of the novel. He has no offensive magic, but can deflect offensive magics as if to use them for himself. He possesses strong defensive magic.

== Locations ==
=== Abaddon ===
Abaddon is a netherworld that lies beneath Landover. Having no sun, moon, or stars, its sky is black, and the mountainous landscape of jagged peaks and deep gorges is lit only by the glow of molten lava and a strange white light that dances on the horizon. The demons of Abaddon are the worst exiles driven from the fairy world, and they are ruled over by the most powerful demon, called the Iron Mark.

=== The Deep Fell ===
The Deep Fell is the home of Nightshade the witch. It is a vast sinkhole in the northwest part of Landover. The Deep Fell is connected to the fairy mists, and the G'home Gnomes sometimes sneak into the fell to scout for items to pilfer.

=== Elderew ===
Elderew is the main city of the Lake Country people, and home of the River Master. It is surrounded by a dense marsh that can only be penetrated either way with the River Master's help. Inside the marsh is an open-air amphitheater where the fairy people hold their celebrations and festivals. The city itself is built into a group of huge trees, twice the size of California redwood trees, extending from ground to treetops. The cottages and shops of the city are connected by a network of tree lanes and stairways.

=== Moons of Landover ===
Landover possesses eight moons, each one a different color: white, peach, pale mauve, burnt rose, sea green, beryl, turquoise, and jade. Two of the moons, peach and pale mauve, are visible during daylight hours, with the rest being only visible after dusk. The moons rise and set like normal satellites. During certain rare times of the year all eight moons are visible in the night sky at once. About every other month there is a new-moon phase, when some of the eight moons are below the horizon and the rest are in their dark phase, leaving the nighttime sky lit only by the stars.

=== Sterling Silver ===
Sterling Silver is the name of the castle that serves as the home of the king of Landover. The castle itself is a living entity, personified as female. It sits on a small island surrounded by a lake, accessible (early in the first novel) only by a magical boat called the lake skimmer. After Ben became High Lord, he had the bridge across the lake rebuilt to allow more open access to the castle. As a magical entity, the castle is responsive to the moods and feelings of the king, and he in turn can sense the energy coming from its walls. One of the towers also holds the Landsview, a magical chamber that allows a user to instantly see any part of Landover as if rapidly flown there. In the absence of a king, the castle begins to fall victim to a form of physical decay, called the Tarnish. If unchecked, the Tarnish will eventually consume the castle and spread out into the whole of Landover.
