= Magic Kingdom for Sale—Sold! =

1986 fantasy novel by Terry Brooks

- Paperback cover
- Author: Terry Brooks
- Cover artist: Darrell K. Sweet
- Language: English
- Series: Magic Kingdom of Landover
- Genre: Fantasy, quest
- Publisher: Del Rey Books
- Publication date: March 12, 1986
- Publication place: United States
- Media type: Print (hardcover, mass market paperback); Audio (abridged)
- Pages: 384 (mass market paperback)
- ISBN: 0-345-31758-0 (mass market paperback)
- OCLC: 15508892
- Followed by: The Black Unicorn

Magic Kingdom for Sale—Sold! is a fantasy novel by American writer Terry Brooks, the first in his Magic Kingdom of Landover series. Written in 1986, it tells the story of how Ben Holiday, a talented but depressed Chicago trial lawyer, comes to be king of Landover, an otherworldly magical kingdom. The book was re-released as part of a Landover omnibus in 2009.

== Plot summary ==
The novel begins with Ben Holiday, a trial lawyer from Chicago, lamenting the loss of his wife and unborn child in a car accident. He finds an advertisement in an upscale Christmas catalog claiming to offer a magical kingdom for one million dollars by a man named Mr. Meeks. Although skeptical, Ben pursues the offer out of a desperate need to start a new life.

Ben receives a magical medallion and is transported through a swirling mist to the kingdom of Landover. He learns that Landover is a world that connects many other worlds such as Earth. It is surrounded by the Fairy Mist wherein reside creatures of Fairy that created Landover and guard the passages to these worlds. He finds it not exactly as described. He soon finds that Landover has not had a true king in twenty years. The son of the last king did not wish to take up the throne and escaped with the court wizard, Meeks, to Earth. They have been selling the throne to dozens of people in the past two decades, but no one has been able to face the challenge and successfully complete so much as a few months as king. Further, kings of Landover used to be protected by a magical knight called the Paladin, but he has not been seen since the last king's death.

Further, Ben has only four loyal subjects. The court wizard is a hack named Questor Thews, who is also Meeks' half-brother. Abernathy is the court scribe, who was transformed into a large dog by one of Questor's spells gone awry. Finally, two creatures called Kobolds, Bunion and Parsnip, serve Ben as caretakers of the castle and as protection against the wild creatures of the kingdom.

Ben's coronation is barely attended, so he decides to travel the land to gain the pledges of the local rulers. He travels first to meet with the Lords of the Greensward, the most prominent landowners in the kingdom. They agree to serve Ben only on the condition that he rid them of Strabo, a dragon that ravages their countryside.

Next Ben visits the River Master and the Fairy fold of Elderew, a city of outcasts from the Fairy Mists. The River Master also places conditions on his pledge, requiring Ben to stop the Lords of the Greensward from polluting their rivers. In the river country Ben stumbles upon a sylph named Willow. She is also a fairy creature who turns into a tree some evenings. She claims that the Fairies have foretold that she will marry Ben. Though he initially rebuffs her, he finds himself falling in love with her over time.

Ben is entreated by Fillip and Sot, two of a race of thievish "G'Home Gnomes" to rescue some of their people from a clan of trolls. They manage to do so, but barely escape with their lives. They finally decide to ask for the help of the witch Nightshade, and travel to her home in the marshes known as the Deep Fell. She tells Ben to enter the Fairy Mists, where he may be able to obtain mind-controlling Io Powder to use on Strabo. Ben does so and endures a series of frightening trials by the Fairy creatures to obtain the powder. Emerging from the mists, he finds that Nightshade has used her magic to banish all of his companions to Abbadon, Landover's underworld. Nightshade attempts to trick Ben out of his Io Powder, but Ben uses some of the substance on the witch and sends her to an uncertain fate in the Fairy Mists.

Ben travels to the Fire Springs to confront Strabo, and is surprised to find the dragon to be sentient and rather well-spoken, if still vicious. Ben uses the Io Powder on Strabo, and rides him to Abaddon to rescue his friends with the help of two g'home gnomes. He also extracts a promise from the dragon to stay out of the Greensward.

Finally, Ben is challenged by the Mark, lord of Abaddon, to a duel for the throne. Ben's medallion responds during the fight and transforms Ben into the Paladin, allowing him to subdue the demon. The challenge is witnessed by the leaders from the Greensward, Elderew, and the Troll tribes, who then swear their allegiance. Ben Holiday, King of Landover, then sets about to restore Landover to its former glory.

== Film, TV or theatrical adaptations ==
The rights to sell a film based on this book have been bounced around since the 1980s, but as of April 2010, the film was said to be as active, though it is still unclear if the film will eventually see screening. Although the film is seen as in production, actors have not even been talked about. Brooks was in negotiations with Hollywood execs, per his monthly letter at terrybrooks.net.

Previous plans for adding two children to the screen play have been dropped according to Terry Brooks because of the lack of a real story arc for each character.

The option to produce the film reverted to Brooks in July 2010.

In January 2012, Brooks issued a statement on terrybrooks.net in a blog entry titled "Hollywood Is Going to Landover", indicating that the option for a Hollywood produced Magic Kingdom for Sale—Sold! film had been granted to Warner Brothers Studios.

== Reception ==
J. Michael Caparula reviewed Magic Kingdom for Sale...Sold! in Space Gamer/Fantasy Gamer No. 80. Caparula commented that "I think Brooks could have done better, considering that his Shannara novels at least benefited from a colorful world setting".

== Reviews ==
- Review by John C. Bunnell (1986) in Dragon Magazine, July 1986
- Review by Mark W. Antonoff (1986) in Science Fiction Review, Fall 1986
- Review by Baird Searles (1986) in Isaac Asimov's Science Fiction Magazine, October 1986
- Review by Andy Sawyer (1986) in Paperback Inferno, #62
- Review by Barbara Davies (1986) in Vector 135
- Review by Phyllis McDonald (1988) in Interzone, #24, Summer 1988
