= The Black Unicorn =

1987 novel by Terry Brooks

- First edition
- Author: Terry Brooks
- Cover artist: Darrell K. Sweet
- Language: English
- Series: Magic Kingdom of Landover
- Genre: Fantasy
- Publisher: Del Rey Books
- Publication date: October 1987
- Publication place: United States
- Pages: 320 pp
- ISBN: 0-345-33528-7
- OCLC: 18500680
- Preceded by: Magic Kingdom for Sale—Sold!
- Followed by: Wizard at Large

The Black Unicorn is the second novel in the Magic Kingdom of Landover series by Terry Brooks, and the follow-up to Magic Kingdom for Sale—Sold!. Published in 1987, the book revolves around the evil wizard Meeks, attempting to wrest control of the kingdom from Ben Holiday, the High Lord and the appearance of a mythical black unicorn in the kingdom.

== Plot ==
Ben Holiday, court magician Questor Thews and the sylph Willow each have a vivid, prophetic dream. Ben dreams that Miles Bennett, his former law partner back in Chicago is in trouble. Questor dreams of the location of two ancient books of magic and Willow dreams of a black unicorn containing great power and a golden bridle that can harness the animal. Only the half-dog court scribe Abernathy voices his misgivings about the dreams.

Upon returning to the old world, Ben discovers that Miles is fine. Suspicious, he hurries back to Landover. Unbeknownst to him, Meeks (the evil wizard that originally sent Ben into Landover) has stowed away in Ben's clothing using his magic, returning as well. At the castle, Ben finds that Questor has found the books of magic, though they seem useless. One is filled with illustrations of unicorns and the other appears burned from the inside. Willow is still missing.

That night, Ben is attacked by Meeks. The old wizard casts a glamour over each of them, so that Meeks appears as Ben and Ben appears as a common peasant. Failing to recognize his true identity and thinking him an intruder, Questor has Ben thrown out of the castle.

Ben searches for Willow, hoping to convince her of his identity and prevent her from delivering the bridle to Meeks. Along the way he encounters Edgewood Dirk, a prism cat from the fairy world. Dirk is able to recognize Ben as the High King, and taunts him for his inability to overcome his situation. Ben is able to arrange a meeting with Willow's father, the River Master, who fails in an attempt to capture the Black Unicorn and keep it as his own. The River Master blames Ben for his loss and sends him away without help. Later, Ben encounters the Earth Mother, who tells them that Willow has gone to the Deep Fell to retrieve the golden bridle from the witch Nightshade.

Unsure if the witch has returned to the Deep Fell since their last encounter, Ben enlists the help of the G’home Gnomes, Fillip and Sot, to investigate. They find that she has indeed returned and are apprehended. Nightshade reveals that she is no longer in possession of the bridle, it having been stolen by the dragon Strabo some time ago. Seeing an opportunity to regain the bridle from the dragon, Nightshade transports herself and her captives to Strabo's lair.

Meanwhile, Questor and Abernathy have been evicted from the castle for failing to capture the black unicorn. They make their way to Strabo's lair, seeking the dragon's help in determining the nature of the black unicorn. Nightshade and her prisoners appear, and Strabo admits that he has already given up the bridle to Willow for the price of a song. This infuriates Nightshade, and the meeting devolves into a furious battle between dragon and witch, while Ben and company escape.

Ben is finally able to convince his friends of his identity, and they eventually come across Willow, who has harnessed the black unicorn in a small meadow. Meeks arrives, still in disguise, and tries to persuade a confused Willow into bringing the unicorn to him instead of the true king. Edgewood Dirk enters into the confusion, prompting Meeks to launch an explosive attack against the Prism Cat. Willow mounts the black unicorn and flees, while the firefight turns the meadow into a scorched battlefield and scatters the party.

Abernathy, Questor, and Willow are captured by Meeks and his army of imps. Alone, Ben and Edgwood Dirk have one last cryptic conversation, and the cat disappears. Thinking on the cats' words, Ben acknowledges his love for Willow, and finds that he can break Meek's spell by conquering his self-deception. Ben summons the Paladin, who charges off to rescue Willow. As the Paladin battles with skeletal creatures summoned by Meeks, Abernathy bites the wizard in the leg, making him drop the books of magic. Streaking through the air, the black unicorn rips the binding from the books, releasing a multitude of white unicorns who scatter. A brief but intense battle of magic between the unicorn and Meeks erupts, and Meeks is finally vanquished.

It is revealed that the fairy world sent unicorns into various worlds to help restore peoples' faith in magic. Landover wizards from long ago captured these unicorns, imprisoning their spirits in one book and their bodies in another. Occasionally the spirit of the unicorns would break free, manifesting as the black unicorn, and the bridle was created to recapture this creature. Meeks had hidden the books before becoming exiled to Earth, and sent the dreams to set into motion events that would return possession of the books to him.

In the epilogue, a white unicorn dashes down the streets of Chicago, leaving onlookers in wonder.
