= John Callaghan (Galway) =

John Callaghan (murder victim) was killed at the Fair of Turloughmore, Tuesday 1 August 1843.

Callaghan was a son of Michael Callaghan of Moycullen. There had been some disturbances at the fair, though Callaghan was not a participant. Around seven p.m. he was standing beside Pat Nolan, a relation and a cousin, who had erected a tent for the fair, Nolan being a blacksmith. Nolan stated that

I saw stones thrown before the firing commenced. The police were obliged to run for their lives in Qualters house; they were struck with sticks and stones and followed by the people that pursued them, but not so far as the house. Half an hour did not elapse between the stone throwning and the firing, but all fighting had ceased before the firing without my observing it, as there were no people between the police and me. [on been shot] ... he fell on his back; he called for a drink which were the only words I heard him speak; I lifted him up, and with the assistance of some friends brought him into my tent and went for the Rev. John Burke to attend him; there were no people between the police and where deceased and I were standing; the police went into a house within eighty yards of my tent; I did not see any persons throwing stones at the house; the deceased was not engaged in any of the riots during the day, nor could he be without my knowledge, and am also certain there were no people between the police and where we were standing.

The court found Thomkins Brew, Esq., and the police, guilty of wilful murder. However, he was never brought to trial because he was killed in a shooting shortly thereafter.

A ballad entitled ”The Sorrowful Lamentation of Callaghan, Greally, (sic)and Mullen” (in An Irish Literature Reader Poetry, Prose, Drama, editors Maureen O’Rourke Murphy & James MacKillop, Syracuse University Press. Second edition 2006) describes the events of the day and subsequent trial. However it talks of several deaths and the title may refer to the other victims. There are seven verses given and the opening line is “Come, tell me, dearest mother, what makes my father stay ...”
