= A Princess of Landover =

2009 novel by Terry Brooks

- First edition US book cover
- Author: Terry Brooks
- Language: English
- Series: Magic Kingdom of Landover
- Genre: Fantasy novel
- Publisher: Del Rey Books (US); Orion (UK)
- Publication date: US: August 18, 2009; UK: September 3, 2009
- Publication place: United States
- Pages: 352 pp
- ISBN: 0-345-45852-4
- Preceded by: Witches' Brew

A Princess of Landover by Terry Brooks is the sixth novel of the Magic Kingdom of Landover series.

== Publication ==
A Princess of Landover was published in hardcover in the United States on August 18, 2009 and in the United Kingdom on September 3.

== Synopsis ==
The book begins a prologue on the witch Nightshade still trapped in the form of a crow in a cage in Woodland Park Zoo, having been exiled from Landover for more than five years. Apart from having mysteriously appeared in the cage, her red eyes marked her different from other birds and elicited brief interest from animal experts. They gave up trying to study her after failing repeatedly to capture her, despite her being in a cage.

The story proper begins in the principal's office of the exclusive private school Carringon Women's Preparatory in New England where Mistaya "Misty" Holiday had been sent by Ben to "learn about places other than" Landover. The school was informed that her parents were away most of the time and all correspondence to be made via Miles Bennett, Ben's former law partner. The headmistress Harriet Appleton was with Misty, recounting the girl's previous visits to the same office.

The first was when Misty organized a school protest and shut down classes for three days when the school tried to remove a two-hundred-year-old tree from the school grounds.

The second was when Misty formed an unapproved club for students to "engage in a bonding-with-nature program", the sticking point for the school authorities being ritualistic scarring for the members, which Misty thought would "convey the depth of commitment" and "reminder of the pain and suffering human ignorance fostered". Besides, Misty thought it should not be a problem as the "scarring was done in places that weren't normally exposed to the light of day".

The third and current visit came about because Misty had done something to terrify fellow student Rhonda Masterson to the point of hysterics and had to be sedated by a nurse. Rhonda and other blue-blooded East Coast snots had been bullying Misty until the latter was pushed too far by being called a name Misty refused to repeat. In retaliation, Misty conjured up an image of Strabo, the last dragon of Landover.

Though the headmistress could not be sure what Misty had done, she suspended Misty from school and indicated she would consider accepting Misty back if Misty agrees to be the type of student expected in Carringon.

Misty was only too glad to leave and decided to do so immediately instead of waiting for the Christmas break. Taking a flight to Dulles, the Waynesboro, she returned to Landover through a portal located in George Washington and Jefferson National Forests, passable only by certain magic.

As Misty arrived in Landover, thinking about resuming her study of magic with Questor, she was met unexpectedly by Strabo, who somehow knew and made it clear he did not appreciate his image being used by Misty. Her next encounter was much more pleasant, with the mud puppy Haltwhistle coming to greet her. The third encounter before she reached home was a tied-up G'home Gnome Poggwydd, whom she rescued.

Once at home in Sterling Silver, Ben was informed to his dismay the reason of Misty's return. After a heated argument with Misty, Ben discussed with his advisors, Questor Thews and Abernathy.

Questor suggested for Misty to be sent to organize the Libiris, a royal library which was started by the last wise and dedicated king of Landover, to foster greater interest in reading for all subjects of Landover. The project stalled and the library fell into neglect. Questor proposed fixing the library and reopening it would be a worthwhile project for Misty. It was revealed that Questor and Abernathy also withheld something from Ben about the libiris.

Before Ben could approach Mistaya about the project, he was presented with a proposal of marriage to his daughter from Laphroig, lord of Rhyndweir, the largest of the Greensward baronies. Personally repulsed, Ben diplomatically avoided giving a direct answer, but Laphroig chose to interpret it as tacit approval to woo the girl, and sprung himself upon Misty who had not been informed.

Aghast, Misty rebelled and refused to accept Ben's explanation, nor his idea of her going to the Libiris. She chose to run away from home to her grandfather and enlisted the aid of Poggwydd to hide some of the packings she would need, but this also resulted in her becoming stuck with the Gnome as a travelling companion.

In addition, she was joined by the mysterious cat Edgewood Dirk who seemed to be able to come and go as it pleases, and refused to talk or appear other than an ordinary cat except when alone with her.

When Misty arrived at her grandfather's domain of the lake country, he allowed her to stay but refused to take her side against her father. Realising her grandfather was going to send her back, Misty took a chance when Edgewood Dirk offered her to escape.

At Dirk's subtle proddings, Misty realised the only place she can go to escape from being found by her father or grandfather was the Libiris, the very place she was supposed to go in the first place. Convincing herself that she was going on her own accord, Misty presented herself as a peasant girl to the Libiris.

Misty was almost turned away by the Libiris staff Rufus Pinch, had not his assistant Thom who intervened and pretended Misty was his sister Ellice. Together, they seemed to persuade Craswell Crabbit, the person in charge of Libiris, to allow Misty to stay and help with the work in organising the books.

While Ben and the River King had been trying unsuccessfully to locate Misty, Laphroig deployed his spies to watch the royal castle, convinced he could take advantage of the situation. Questor and Abernathy discussed between themselves what would be the "last place" anyone would think of looking for Misty and came to a startling conclusion that the Libiris might be the place.

Questor made a secret visit to the Libiris and contacted Misty. By then, Misty realised something strange was going on in the Libiris and was convinced Crabbit was up to something bad. She was determined to stay on to investigate while Questor was to return to Sterling Silver, ready to act as backup if necessary.

Misty discovered some similarities between the Libiris and the sentient castle Sterling Silver. With Thom's help, she learned that books of magic were being passed to demons of Abaddon. With some help from Edgewood Dirk, she was able to implement a temporary fix.

Misty's efforts however were discovered by Craswell who had her and Thom captured. Apparently, Craswell had known all along her identity as Princess of Landover.

Meanwhile, through his spies watching Sterling Silver, Laphroig learned the location of Mistaya and set forth there with a large group of armed men to demand Misty from Crabbit. Deciding to play off Laphroig and Ben against each other, Crabbit offered to help by inducing Misty to agree to marry Laphroig, using the threat of Thom's life in the process.

Misty came up with a plan quickly and agreed to the ceremony, demanding it to be held outdoors, and promising not to escape. Once in place, she cast a spell to bring forth the image of Strabo again. Though the illusion was done correctly, the uproar it caused was short lived and she and Thom remained prisoners. However, that was only part of her plan - her goal was to incite the appearance of the real Strabo who promised to visit her if she ever invoke his image again.

The arrival of the real Strabo was much more effective at disrupting the wedding, but Strabo soon got distracted chasing after the armoured men-at-arms which he considered delicacies. Misty was still faced with the armed Laphroig, Pinch who had a crossbow and Crabbit the magician. A stunning explosion occurred when Laphroig's thrown dagger, Pinch's crossbow bolt, and magic from Crabbit and Misty came together.

When the explosion cleared and Misty recovered from being stunned, Laphroig had been turned to stone and there was no sign of Crabbit nor Pinch. Misty had no time to congratulate herself for the demons of Abaddon were breaking through within the Libiris.

With Thom's help, Misty managed to seal the breach from Abaddon. The Libiris began to heal itself, being a creation from the materials taken from Sterling Silver. It was all over by the time Ben and the others from Sterling Silver arrived.

Thom turned out to be the missing brother of Laphroig. Succeeding to the barony, he chose to give the land to the subjects of Rhyndweir in return for reasonable tax to the crown.

Back in the Woodland Park Zoo, the strange crow with red eyes disappeared as mysteriously as it had appeared before. The two men in strange attire appeared in the same cage, ranting in an unknown language. After being taken away by security, the two ended up in custody of Homeland Security, which also could not understand them nor figure out where they came from.

== Characters ==
- Vince - a staff at Woodland Park Zoo who continued to look at the crow which was Nightshade every day.
- Harriet Appleton - Headmistress of Carringon Women's Preparatory. She suspended Misty at the beginning of the story.
- Rhonda Masterson - snobbish student at Carrington's who chose the wrong target to bully and was frightened to hysteria in return.
- Becky - roommate of Misty at Carrington.
- Miles Bennett - former law partner of Ben Holiday.
- Strabo - last dragon of Landover, who personally liked Misty and her mother Willow, but not her father.
- Haltwhistle - a mud-puppy, gift of Earth Mother to Misty. In Landover, mud puppies must be called by their owner daily or they will return to Earth Mother.
- Poggwydd - Landover Gnome rescued by Misty.
- Ben Holliday - king of Landover who had come from the "real world".
- Willow - a sylph, daughter of the River King, wife of Ben Holiday and mother of Misty.
- Questor Thews - a rather inept court wizard but loyal to Ben.
- Abernathy - a capable scribe of Ben despite having been turned into the form of a large wheaten terrier.
- Berwyn Laphroig - Lord of Rhyndweir. His father Kallendbor had allied with Nightshade against Ben five years before. Kallendbor was killed when the plot failed. Laphroig had his older brother killed eighteen months after the latter succeeded the barony. Laphroig only other and younger brother disappeared shortly, his mother and sisters kept in virtual imprisonment. Laphrog took and discarded a series of wives before the third bore him a son. Shortly after Misty's return, both mother and son died in "tragic accident", freeing him to marry again.
- Shoopdiesel - a Gnome and friend of Poggwydd.
- Edgewood Dirk - a fairy-kind in the form a silver-and-black Prism cat. Dirk had powers such that it cannot be magically detected, nor anyone in its company.
- Cordstick - scribe to Laphroig who harboured greater ambitions to become Minister of State.
- Rufus Pinch - overseer at the Libiris.
- Craswell Crabbit - magician who was assigned by the previous wise king to be in charge of the Libiris.
- Thom - an apparently simply peasant boy working at the Libiris.
- Andjen Thomlinson - the missing youngest brother of Laphroig.

== Chapter titles ==
- "It's All Happening at the Zoo"
- "Unexpected Consequences"
- "Strange Creatures Like Herself"
- "Father Knows Best"
- "Froggy Went A-Courtin"
- "Misunderstandings"
- "Flight"
- "Misery Loves Company"
- "Grandfather's Eyes"
- "Edgewood Dirk"
- "The Princess Is Missing"
- "Libiris"
- "His Eminence"
- "Back in the Stacks"
- "They Seek Her Here, They Seek Her There"
- "They Seek That Princess Everywhere!"
- "The Voice in the Shadows"
- "Revelations"
- "Cat's Paws"
- "Misdirection"
- "Sadly Mistaken"
- "Frogs, Dogs, and Throgs"
- "The Lesser of Two Evils"
- "Braveheart"
- "Till Death Do Us Part"
- "Demons at the Gates"
- "No Place Like Home"
- "Déjà Vu"
