= Noël Bourret =

18th-century French clockmaker

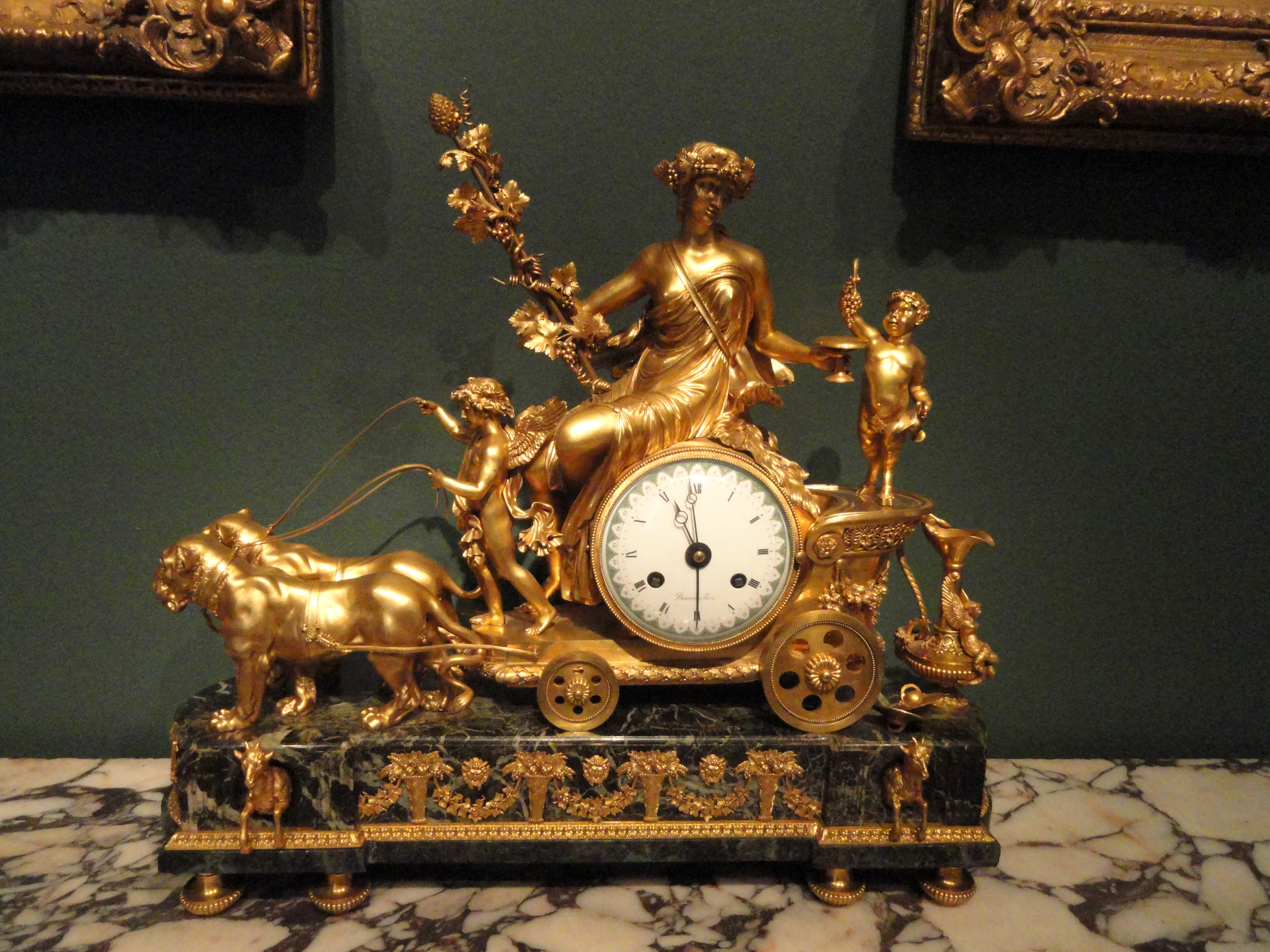
Chariot clock, movement by Noël Bourret, bronzier unknown, c. 1800

Noël Bourret (c. 1755 - 30 August 1803) was a celebrated French clockmaker and businessman active in Paris from 1785-1803.

Bourret was born in the Languedoc-Roussillon region of France at Saint-André-de-Sangonis, near Lodève, to innkeeper Jean-André Bourret and Marguerite née Astic. In 1785 he married Marie Berthelain, and in that year was first recorded as working in Paris as an apprentice (compagnon) clockmaker and then as a merchant of clocks, circa 1789. From 1790-1802 he worked at Palais-Royal, then known as the Palais de l'Égalité and subsequently the Palais du Tribunat, collaborating with well-known bronziers including Pierre-Philippe Thomire. During this time, he created at least 1,395 watches, and his customers ranged from aristocrats such as Baron Coste d'Espagnac to the Revolutionary advocate Merlin de Thionville. In 1800, in the Directoire era, he sent 7,400 francs worth of merchandise to Monsieur de Mirepoix at Saint Petersburg, possibly including a clock now in the Hermitage Museum.

Bourret's interests were not limited to clocks. He served as a juror of the Revolutionary Tribunal in 1794, and in 1802 began to operate a ballroom in the Tivoli de la Folie Boutin gardens. Later that year, he handed over management to his wife so that he could travel to Martinique to run a business in tropical produces. However, shortly after his arrival, he died at Rivière-Salée.
