= Boeree =

Surname list

Boeree is a surname. Notable people with the surname include:

- C. George Boeree (1952–2021), American professor of psychology and language creator
- Liv Boeree (born 1984), British poker player, television presenter, speaker, and writer
