= Witches' Brew (novel) =

1995 novel by Terry Brooks

- Book cover
- Author: Terry Brooks
- Language: English
- Series: Magic Kingdom of Landover
- Genre: Fantasy
- Publisher: Del Rey Books
- Publication date: April 1995
- Publication place: United States
- Pages: 352 pp
- ISBN: 0-345-38702-3
- OCLC: 34968729
- Preceded by: The Tangle Box
- Followed by: A Princess of Landover

Witches' Brew by Terry Brooks is the fifth novel of the Magic Kingdom of Landover series. Published in 1995, the plot has an usurper who claims to be from another world calling for Ben's abdication from the throne. Upon Ben's refusal, he soon begins to send several evil, magic creatures against him. During this time, Nightshade kidnaps Ben and Willow's new child, Mistaya, in a dangerous attempt to subvert her and use her innate magic. Meanwhile, Questor and Abernathy are stuck back in Earth to meet up with an old friend, leaving Ben and Willow alone to deal with the new threat.
