= Mount Brew =

Mount Brew may refer to:

- Mount Brew (Lillooet Ranges), just south of Lillooet, British Columbia, Canada
- Mount Brew (Cheakamus River), near Whistler/Squamish, British Columbia, Canada
