= Jean-Louis Brue =

French general

Jean-Louis Brue (2 April 1780 – 22 May 1832) was a French officer who was promoted to the rank of General de Brigade during the Hundred Days in 1815.
