= Iron Brew =

Iron Brew may refer to:

- Irn-Bru, Scottish soft drink formerly known as "Iron Brew"
- Iron Brew (South African drink), South African soft drink
