= Amy Bourret =

American attorney and author

- Citizenship: U.S.
- Education: Yale Law School
- Occupations: Writer and attorney
- Writing career
- Language: English

Amy Jo Bourret (July 20, 1962 - November 26, 2015) was an American attorney and author. Her best known work is the novel, Mothers and Other Liars.

== Life and career ==
Bourret was born in Denver, Colorado to Carole Wedemeyer Bourret and John Lowell Bourret. She attended schools in Salt Lake City, Kansas City and Houston, and graduated from Spring High School in 1980. She enrolled in Texas Tech University, where she graduated summa cum laude in 1984. She graduated from Yale Law School in 1987 and was clerk for the Honorable Patrick E. Higginbotham of the Fifth Circuit Court of Appeals. She was an associate at the Dallas Office of Baker and Botts and was a partner at Kirkpatrick and Lockhart (KLGates). In school and in her practice, she did pro bono work for child advocacy organizations. She found she was unable to be a full-time child advocate and so also worked in corporate law before she retired to become a writer. From a young age, Bourret wrote about lost children, a recurring theme in her work.

She lived for several years in Santa Fe, then divided her time between Aspen, Colorado and Dallas, Texas. She died of lupus.

== Mothers and Other Liars ==
Mothers and Other Liars was Bourret's debut novel. It is about a woman who discovers a baby at a rest stop and raises the child as her own. Years later, she is forced to confront this secret. Her work for child advocacy organizations was part of what inspired this book.
