= Bure River =

Coordinates: 64.62468°N 21.15132°E

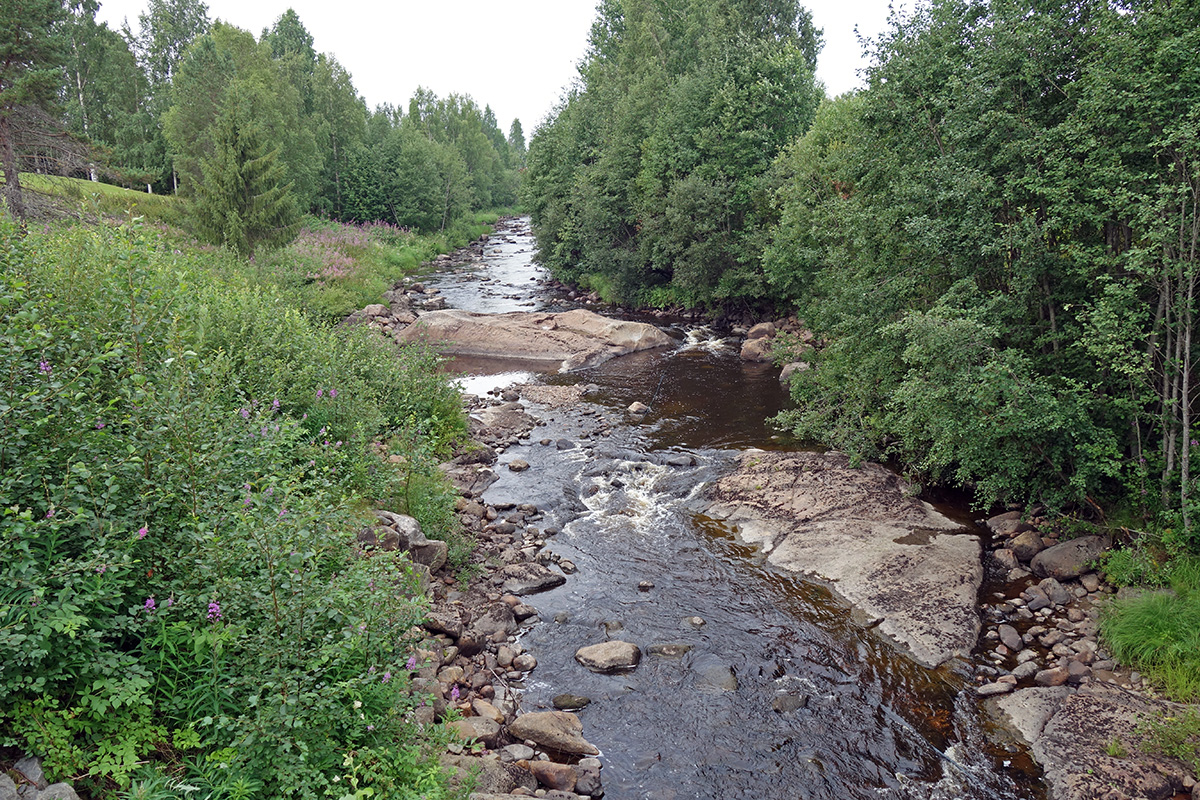
- Native name: Bureälven (Swedish)

Location
- Country: Sweden
- County: Västerbotten

Physical characteristics
- Length: 80 km (50 mi)
- Basin size: 1,045.6 km^{2} (403.7 sq mi)
- Discharge
  - average: 6 m^{3}/s (210 cu ft/s)

Bure River (Swedish: Bureälven) is a river in Sweden.
