= Francis Brew (cricketer) =

Australian cricketer

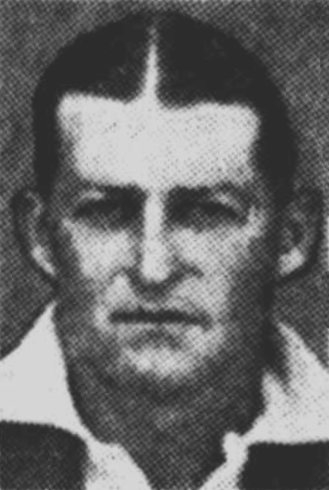

Personal information
- Full name: Francis Malcolm Brew
- Born: 5 July 1903; Petrie Terrace, Queensland, Australia
- Died: 13 January 1974 (aged 70); Sandgate, Queensland, Australia
- Nickname: Mick
- Source: Cricinfo, 1 October 2020

Francis Brew (5 July 1903 – 13 January 1974) was an Australian cricketer. He played in 27 first-class matches for Queensland between 1924 and 1934, and in 1938 he became a member of the Queensland state selection committee.

In Brisbane Grade Cricket Brew played for Western Suburbs from 1921 to 1941 captaining the club for several seasons. He was an all-rounder who bowled legspin, and in grade cricket he regularly opened the batting for Western Suburbs although he was not as successful with the bat in First-class cricket never scoring a century in his state career.

== See also ==
- List of Queensland first-class cricketers
