= Antonio Brú =

Spanish scientist

- Born: May 4, 1962 (age 64); Madrid, Spain
- Education: Complutense University of Madrid
- Scientific career
- Fields: Theoretical physics Applied mathematics
- Workplaces: Complutense University of Madrid
- Doctoral advisor: Miguel Ángel Rodríguez

Antonio Brú Espino (born 1962) is Theoretical physicist and permanent professor in the Department of Applied Mathematics at the Universidad Complutense de Madrid. Brú received his PhD in 1995 from the Universidad Complutense de Madrid, in physics, with advisor Miguel Ángel Rodríguez. He began his research career in 1989 at the Centro de Investigaciones Energéticas, Medioambientales y Tecnológicas (CIEMAT) in the field of anomalous transport and complex systems. In 1993, he established his own research group to study tumor growth. In 2002, he moved to the Spanish National Research Council (CSIC).

== Cancer research ==
Brú is known for the controversy surrounding his research on cancer, which states (among other things) that:

- The defining factor that determines the growth of solid tumours is not the search for nutrients, but the search for space to grow.
- Solid tumours may be treated solely through an enhancement of the immune response, achievable with high doses of Neupogen, a granulocyte colony-stimulating factor (G-CSF) routinely used in Oncology in order to recover the level of these blood cells after Chemotherapy.

Brú's theory stems from his mathematical research on the Fractal growth of tumour cell colonies in vitro. This growth, according to his studies, would display a set of distinct characteristics with regards to growth patterns and would imply a greater proliferation around tumour boundaries. Brú's team referred this growth pattern as the Universal Dynamics of Tumour Growth. This theory is currently recognised as one of the possible equations to describe tumour growth.

The rationale for the use of Neupogen would be that the concurrence of a massive amount of neutrophils near the edge of the tumour may result in a massive population in the concavities at the tumour edge, consequently blocking its growth. He has published his research in Europhysics Letters (2003), the Biophysical Journal (2003) (where he expands on the MBE theory), and in Physical Review Letters (2004).

His alleged success on the two patients, the fact that Brú comes from the Complutense University, his collaboration with researchers from the Spanish Scientific Research Council CSIC and the San Carlos Hospital in Madrid, as well as the mix of mathematical and biological research, made his theory a breaking news event in Spain.

Brú has publicly asked for the possibility of doing clinical trials in order to confirm his results, but this has been impossible to date. It was nearly done in the Ramón y Cajal hospital in Madrid, but there was no consensus due to conditions deemed unacceptable by Brú's team:

- A statistically insignificant number of patients;
- The addition of a mortality case in the information given for patient consent of which Brú had no knowledge of.
- The animosity from a potential team member.

In June 2007 Brú presented a new proposal for a clinical trial to the Fundación Puigvert in Barcelona for Prostate cancer, but it was rejected by said Foundation.

== Controversy ==
Brú has confronted scientific and personal attacks as well as generalized media derision. The reaction of the Spanish oncology community was also negative (the latter answered by Brú) and resulted in the cancellation of scheduled conferences: The pharmaceutical industry has dismissed his work, something Brú ascribes to the fear of losing the economic benefits derived from conventional treatments.

The SEOM (Spanish Association of Medical Oncology) and la AECC (Spanish Association Against Cancer) have been firm in rejecting the therapy proposed by Brú. Most of the criticism is based on the following arguments:

- His theory has not been proven in preclinical studies and the number of animals used is too low to be considered statistically significant.
- Brú is a physicist and, according to SEOM officials, clinical follow-up of patient progress such as that of the published case, must be done by specialized oncologists.
- He has published only one case of a patient without biopsy.
- Due to the above, the success on the male hepatic patient was reported in a magazine with no impact factor; such factor, according to the SEOM, is keys to measure the scientific quality of an article.
- His research has not been sufficiently broadcast to the scientific community in journals or meetings.
- A segment of the physicians who initially collaborated with Brú terminated their association because of their reticence towards his hypotheses. The loss of these researchers left Brú with the a core team of close friends and relatives.

These criticisms make no reference of the inherent difficulty of:

- Doing clinical experiments such as the ones demanded by Brú without adverse pressure, whether tacit or express.
- Measuring the objective quality of an article by means of the impact factor of a journal.
- Publishing results on scientific journals, especially those with a high impact factor, without internal endorsement;
- Broadcasting experiments or results in a meeting without experimental results.

Most criticism stems from the oncology community and pivots on the lack of preclinical data, as well as from Biophysical experts.

According to Brú the therapy has not been sufficiently developed due to a policy of consistent obstacles from the Spanish oncological community—obstacles which could be described as corporatism and systematic mobbing.

Brú has repeatedly said that he is willing to further discuss his research as long as it solely on scientific grounds and under independent supervision.
