= Francisco de Paula Vallet =

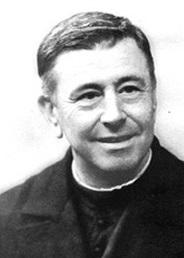
- Born: 14 June 1883; Barcelona
- Died: 1947; Madrid
- Occupation: Catholic priest
- Known for: Parochial Cooperators of Christ the King

Francisco de Paula Vallet (14 June 1883 – 1947) was a Jesuit Catholic priest. He founded the Parochial Cooperators of Christ the King, which arranged five-day retreats following a compressed version of the Spiritual Exercises of Ignatius of Loyola.

== Life ==
Francisco de Paula Vallet was born in Barcelona, Spain, on 14 June 1883 to a Catalan family. He became a Jesuit priest. Vallet developed the idea of compressing the Spiritual Exercises of Saint Ignatius of Loyola into five days, instead of the four weeks provided for in the scheme of Saint Ignatius. The success of the retreats was spectacular. From 1923 to 1927, he devoted himself assiduously to preaching spiritual exercises to men and young people. 12,500 took his retreats during this period.

With the agreement of his superiors, Father Vallet left the Society of Jesus to found his new religious institute in Barcelona, Spain, in 1928. This new institute, the Parochial Cooperators of Christ the King [CPCR], was entirely dedicated to this mission. The first house was opened in Salto, Uruguay. In 1934, the parent organization was transferred from Spain to Chabeuil in Drôme, France. Vallet died in Madrid, Spain, in 1947.

== Five-day retreats ==
Vallet's "method", the key to its rapid success, was based on the following fundamental points:

- Retreat compressed into five days, in silence, with four meditations per day, and with talks with the priests.
- Very great importance given to the "principle and foundation" of the Book of Exercises, and to the notion of eternal salvation. This fundamental principle of eternal salvation was obvious in the time of Saint Ignatius, and was not the subject of meditation.
- Very great importance given to the "first week" and to the confession which is the conclusion of it (it can be a general confession, which takes up all the mortal sins of the past, including those which have already been confessed), and to the notion of "living in a state of grace".
- Great importance given to the "election" or way of making important decisions (in particular choice of a state of life), and to vocation. This concern for vocations was very important to him: so he returned quickly from Uruguay to Spain, because he realized that there would not be enough vocations.
- A certain insistence on the recruitment of new retreatants, and the need for the old ones to renew the retreat, in order to be able to persevere.
- Exercises given to men and young people, in this way to have more influence in the Church and in society.
- Importance given to Christ the King, that is to say the "Social Kingship of Our Lord Jesus Christ" (and its corollary the Social Doctrine of the Church): this theme was topical at the end of the years 1920.
- The encyclical Quas Primas dates from December 1925.
- Being "parish cooperators": the retreatants are not grouped together in a separate world, they are sent to parishes to revitalize them. It is, it seems, this point that stopped the process, because in France the movement ran out of steam due to the hostility of a large number of parishes.

Vallet's influence was very important in Spain, and also in France in particular from 1945 until the 1970s. Even today, and in France in particular, several religious communities give the Spiritual Exercises in five days according to the method of Father Vallet:

- Parochial Cooperators of Christ the King
- Parochial Cooperators Sisters of Christ the King
- Abbey of Saint-Joseph de Clairval in Flavigny-sur-Ozerain
- Priestly Fraternity of Saint Peter
- Society of Saint Pius X
- Istituto Mater Boni Consilii

== Sources ==
- Maurice Conat, Le Magicien du Règne - Francois de Paule Vallet 1884 - 1947, 1967, 74 p.
- Livre de prières et d'exercices de l'œuvre de coopération paroissiale du Christ-Roi, 2° édition, 1963, Maison Nazareth, Chabeuil, 439 p. (généralement appelé : livre bleu, il a fait l'objet de diverses rééditions par les groupes qui ont continué son action, notamment la FSSPX et Flavigny)
- Jean-Christophe Stuccilli, À l'image de Dieu. Marcel Michaud et l'art sacré, Le Poids du monde. Marcel Michaud (1898-1958), sous la direction de Sylvie Ramond et de Jean-Christophe Stuccilli, Lyon, musée des Beaux-Arts, 22 octobre 2011 - 23 janvier 2012, Lyon, Fages éditions, 2011, 320 p. ISBN 9782849752517
