= Josephine Macalister Brew =

British educationist and youth worker

Josephine Macalister Brew CBE (18 February 1904 – 30 May 1957) was a British educationist and youth worker. A 'pioneer of social group work as a vehicle for social education,' her 1946 work Informal Education was the 'first text to deliberately employ the term' and the first solo-authored work on the subject.

== Life and work ==
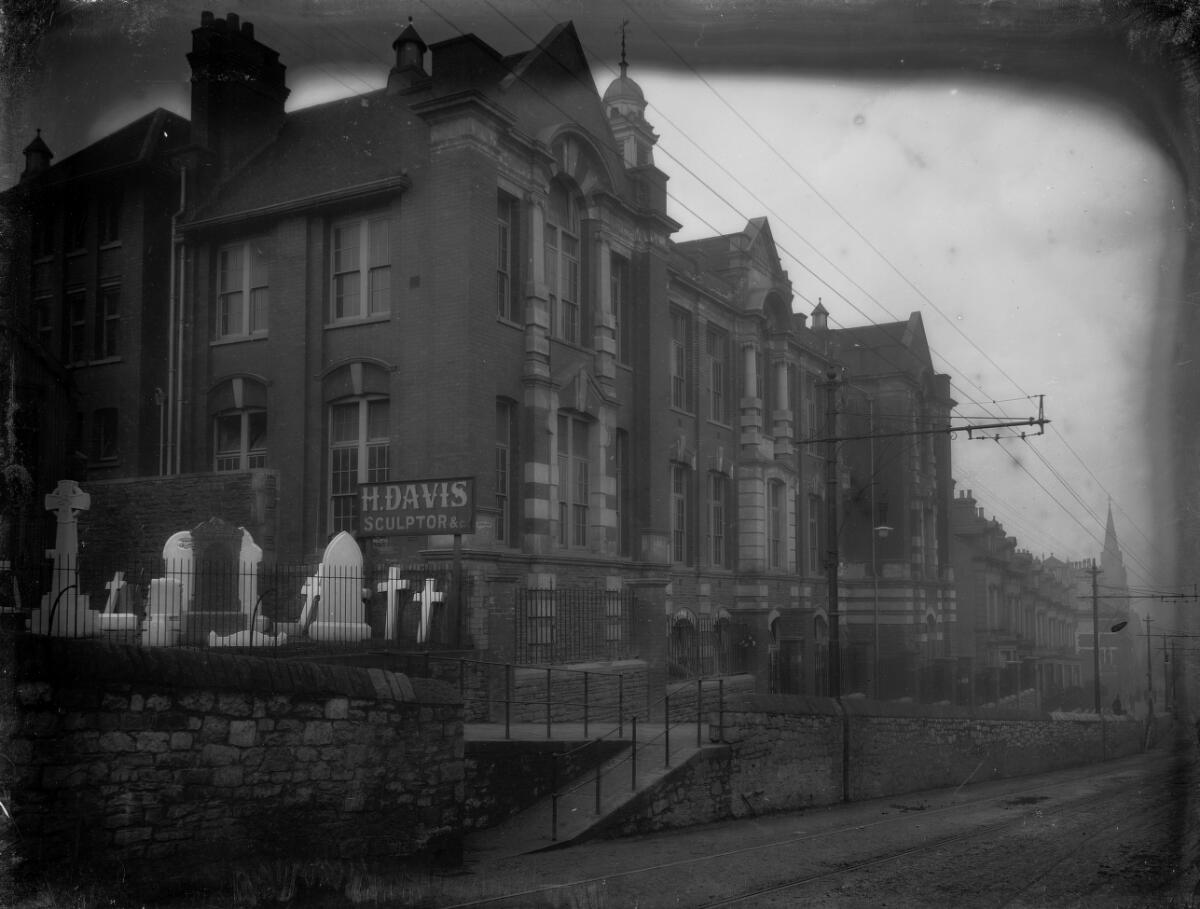
St Woolos School, Newport, which Josephine Macalister Brew attended as a child.

Josephine Macalister Brew was born Mary Winifred Brew in Llanelli, Wales, the daughter of Frederick Charles Brew, a boot and shoe dealer. She studied history at the University of Wales, Aberystwyth, and graduated in 1925, after which she became a history teacher at Shaftesbury High School for Girls, Dorset. In 1932, Brew moved to Cardiff to study for her Doctor of Law.

In Cardiff, Brew began her lifelong involvement in youth and community work, working with the Butetown Women and Girls' Club, and South Wales educational settlements. She later became a youth officer in Lincoln, where she acted as secretary of the Lincoln Federation of Girls Clubs. Subsequently, Brew served on the executive committee of the National Association of Girls' Clubs (later the National Association of Girls' Clubs and Mixed Clubs) for whom, following a comparatively short period as youth officer for Oldham, she was appointed Education Secretary in 1942. Among her colleagues there were Eileen Younghusband and Pearl Jephcott. The National Association of Girls Clubs and Mixed Clubs boasted, in 1944, 108,000 affiliated clubs, described as 'a training-ground for citizenship, giving a foretaste of the responsibilities and joys of an adult life, as well as an experience of community life.' Brew herself was a vocal advocate of mixed clubs, arguing for their benefits to young people and the society in which they lived.

Brew also played a key role in creating the pilot Girls' Award (launched in 1958), part of the Duke of Edinburgh's Award scheme, initiated two years earlier in 1956.

As well as active youth work, Brew was a sought after speaker, and contributor to numerous publications. These included pieces for the Times Educational Supplement, as well as national newspapers. Brew's writing has been described as having 'a characteristic flowing style that moves between erudition and the plain talking of a sensible aunt.'

== Philosophy ==
Brew believed that society had a responsibility to prepare its young people for their role as future citizens in a rapidly changing world. In 'Why Clubs at All?' (1943), she argued that:

They are the citizens of tomorrow, and to them the community has a double responsibility. Firstly, to provide each one of them with the possibilities of full and harmonious development, and secondly, to try to ensure that they are fitted to be members of the community of the future.

In her preface to Informal Education, published in 1946, Brew wrote:

Perhaps nothing will matter more in the next fifty years than the ability of the common man to adapt himself to the changing world - a world in which material prosperity may be just around the corner, but where there are still vast acreages of barren land in the intellectual, emotional and spiritual field.

For Brew, the function of youth work was educating 'individual personalities with powers of judgment who will indulge in group living in the service of a social ideal'. She believed that involvement in youth clubs, and opportunities for association with others, would best equip young people for the requirements of active citizenship; that 'it is in the interplay of social relationships that real and full individuality is attained'. This preparation would act as a counterbalance to a society in which, Brew wrote, 'we educate our children for the first fourteen years of their life as though there were no such thing as industry, and then surrender them to industry as though education had never been.' Brew also believed that, in light of 'much social injustice and many intolerable circumstances', the aim of club leaders should be social reform. In Clubs and Club Making, she argued that:

If young people are to become fully alive to their own powers and capable of being responsible members of society, social conditions must not exist which make that almost impossible. Thus the club leader must constantly seek to persuade the wider community to fit itself to be the kind of society in which these young people can grow up to enter into full citizenship.

== Death and legacy ==
Josephine Macalister Brew died on 30 May 1957 at Woodford Green, Essex. A funeral service was held at the City of London Crematorium on 3 June.

In an obituary in Nature, John Wolfenden wrote that 'there can be few people who have lived so fully, so usefully, or so serviceably' as Brew. 'She would', he concluded, 'prefer to be remembered as one who never lost her astringent affection for hundreds of 'crazy mixed-up kids'.' Dame Isobel Cripps described Brew as a 'constructive force', whose 'great gift to us all is that she has built into the fibre of our nation something which will live on in the generations to come.'

On 13 June 1957, as part of the Queen's Birthday Honours, Brew was appointed CBE.

== Publications ==
- Clubs and Club Making (1943)
- In the Service of Youth, a practical manual of work among adolescents (1944)
- Informal Education; Adventures and Reflections (1946)
- The Young Idea (1956)
- Youth and Youth Groups(1957)
- "Group Work with Adolescents" in Social Group Work in Great Britain, ed. Peter Kuenstler (1954)
