= True Brew =

True Brew may refer to:

- True Brew (EP), by Millencolin, February 2015
- True Brew (album), by Millencolin, April 2015
- True BREW, a testing process in Binary Runtime Environment for Wireless
- "True Brew", a 2000 episode Good Eats, and several similarly titled follow-up episodes
