= Salvador Bru =

Spanish painter

Salvador Bru is a painter, born in Valencia, Spain in 1933. His work has been exhibited throughout the United States, and Europe.

== Biography ==
Bru's parents encouraged him to pursue a stable career, however Bru studied at the Academy of San Carlos and post-graduation, he began working for the J. Walter Thompson advertising agency (JWT). Seeking independence, he freelanced from Barcelona, Spain from 1978 to 1980, before moving to New York City. Here, he accepted work with NBC, and two advertising agencies. He has been regularly commissioned to illustrate for the Washingtonian magazine, corporations including Mobil, the United States Government, and newspapers such as The Washington Post, The Baltimore Sun, The Boston Globe and The New York Times. He has also taught art classes at the University of Barcelona.
