= Kate Brew Vaughn =

Home economy author (1873–1933)

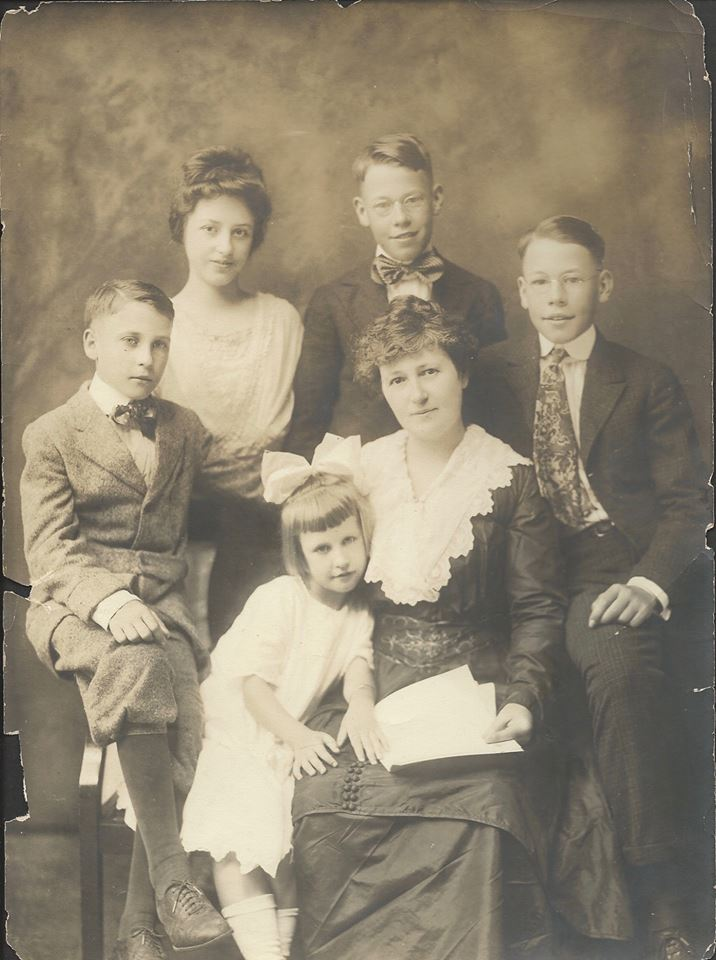
- Kate Brew Vaughn and her children, December 1915 (l. to r.: Edwin, Martha, Katherine, William, and Preston.)
- Born: Katherine Margaret Brew; October 22, 1873; Hendersonville, Tennessee
- Died: May 20, 1933 (aged 59); Los Angeles, California
- Resting place: Forest Lawn Memorial Park (Glendale)
- Education: Peabody College, Nashville
- Occupations: author, lecturer, home economics teacher, newspaper writer, and radio host
- Spouse: William Weaver Vaughn (1863–1932)
- Children: Martha "Marte/Sis" Anne V. Curtiss (1897–1984), twins William Weaver "Ibb" (1900–1947) and James Preston "J.P./Pet" (1900–1968), Edwin Thomas "Tug", and Katherine Brew "Tatty".
- Writing career
- Subject: cooking
- Notable works: Culinary Echoes from Dixie and My Best Recipes

Katherine (Kate) Margaret Brew Vaughn (October 22, 1873 – May 20, 1933) was an American author, lecturer, home economics teacher, newspaper writer, and radio host.

== Early life ==
Kate Brew was born on October 22, 1873, in Hendersonville, Tennessee, the daughter of Patrick H. O'Gorman Brew (1821–1898) and Catherine "Kate" White (1841–1907). She took special training in child-welfare work at the Peabody College in Nashville.

== Career ==
In 1911 Kate Brew Vaughn did her first cooking demonstration at the Tennessee State Fair. After that she went to work for Procter & Gamble in Cincinnati to promote their new product, Crisco. From 1912 to 1914 she traveled throughout the United States giving demonstrations on nutrition and cooking. Hundreds of people came to see her make specialties such as her Japanese Fruit Cake ("Mikado Cake").

On February 19, 1916, the Los Angeles Herald touted:

With a Record-breaking attendance of housewives, clubwomen and teachers in attendance, Mrs. Kate Brew Vaughn, cooking expert, today closed the week's course in Better Food, Better Homes which, under the auspices of The Evening Herald, she has been conducting at Walker auditorium ... Following the demonstration hundreds of women crowded round the famous celebrated domestic science expert to express their gratitude for the benefits they declare they have received through the Better Food, Better Homes free cooking course ... In concluding her talks to the Los Angeles women she urged them to get in close and constant touch with the public school teachers who are doing so much to develop the children.

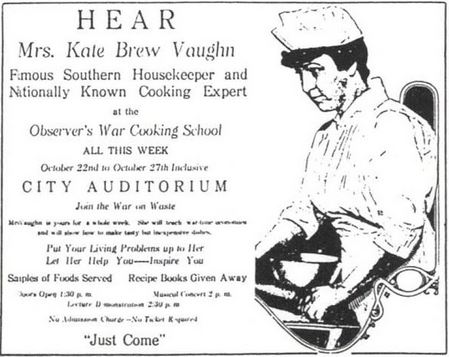
Advertisement from Charlotte Observer, October 22, 1917

In 1917 Vaughn worked in New York to test recipes compatible with wartime shortages and rationing. She taught how to make a Victory Cake eggless, sugarless, and butterless; she said someone once told her they were also "joyless", but then ate three pieces.

Vaughn created the Bureau of Child Hygiene for the North Carolina State Board of Health and served as its director until September 1919. She created the Home Economics Department at the Los Angeles Evening Express on January 12, 1920.

Beginning in 1920 Vaughn was a lecturer on home economics, taught home economics at North Carolina State College, and gave radio lectures on home economics four mornings a week on KNX (AM).

She wrote many booklets under the direction of Herbert Hoover's U.S. Food Commission for Boards of Health and Manufacturers, and was the author of Table Treats in Wartime, Culinary Echoes from Dixie, Up-to-the-Minute Cook Book: A Collection of Tested Recipes, My Best Recipes: A selection from twenty years' experience of adapting and proving tested recipes, and Art of Preserving and Canning. As of 2008, Culinary Echoes from Dixie and My Best Recipes were considered "hot commodities" in historic cookbook circles.

== Personal life ==
On April 14, 1896, Kate Brew married William Weaver Vaughn (1863–1932). They had five children: Martha "Marte/Sis" Anne V. Curtiss (1897–1984), twins William Weaver "Ibb" (1900–1947) and James Preston "J.P./Pet" (1900–1968), Edwin Thomas "Tug", and Katherine Brew "Tatty".

Vaughn moved to California in 1919 with her son Ed and daughter Tatty. She died on May 20, 1933, in Los Angeles, and was buried at Forest Lawn Memorial Park in Glendale.
