= Broo =

Broo may refer to:

- Broo Brewery, an Australian beer company
- Broo, a race of fictional monsters from the role-playing game setting Glorantha
- Broo, a fictional sheepdog puppy character on the TV show The Raccoons
- Broo, a fictional mutant of the Brood alien race appearing in Marvel comic books

== See also ==
- Brew (disambiguation)
- Bro (disambiguation)
- Bru (disambiguation)
