= The Brew (band) =

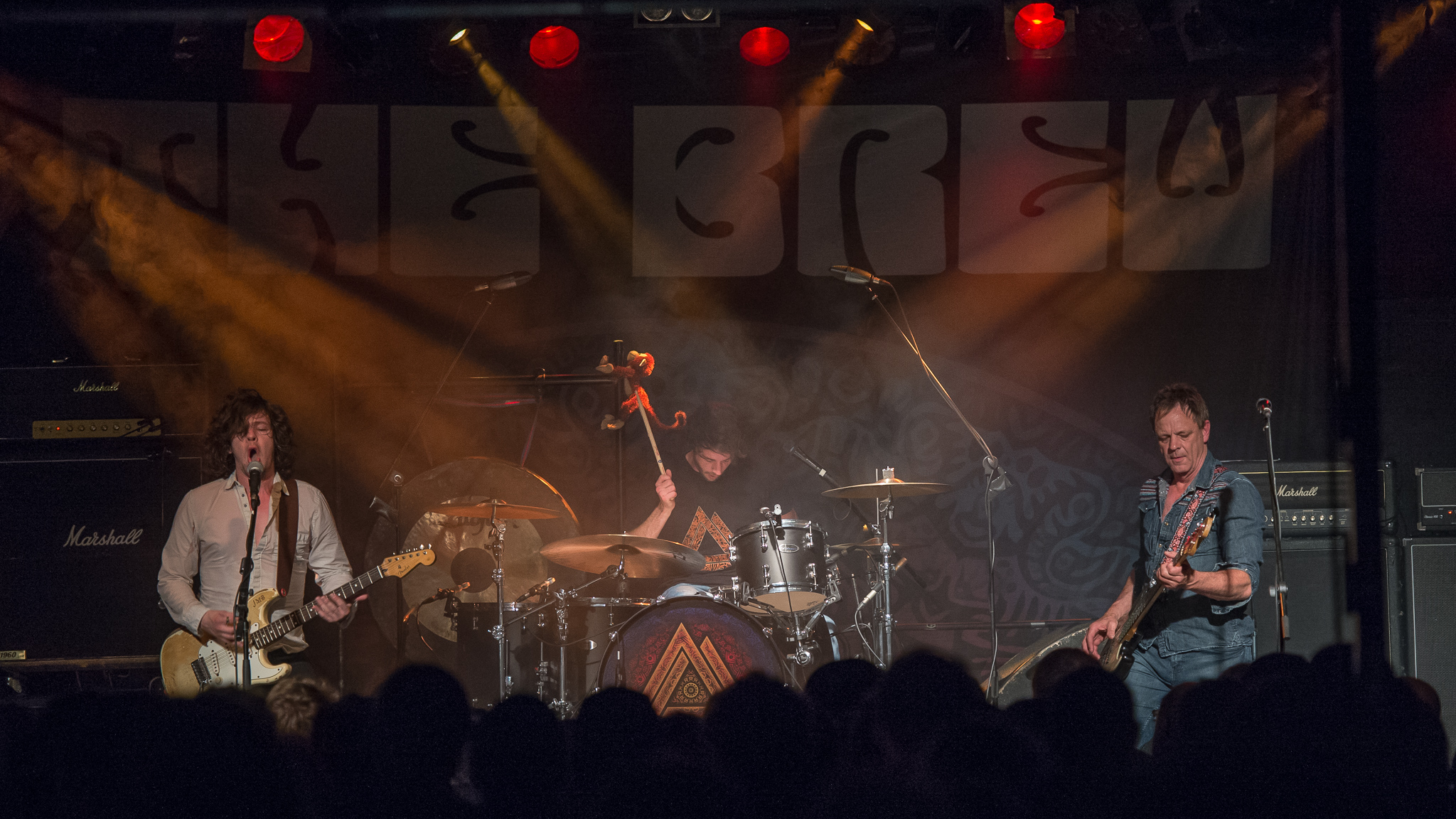

Background information
- Origin: England
- Genres: Blues rock, hard rock
- Years active: 2005–present
- Labels: Napalm Records, Jazzhaus Records, BrewMusic, The Brew, 157 Records, Blues Matters!
- Website: http://www.the-brew.net

The Brew is a British rock band consisting of Tim Smith (bass), Kurtis Smith (drums) and Jason Barwick (guitar, vocals). They were voted "best band" 2006/7 by It's Only Rock & Roll magazine (the magazine of the Rolling Stones fan club). The band was described by rock critic Michael Arens as "earthy, fertile, and sometimes wonderfully grainy" and creating "flawless rock" with a "touch of Psychedelic," and described by RockTimes critic Joachim "Joe" Brookes as a "bridge between the sixties and seventies".

== Biography ==
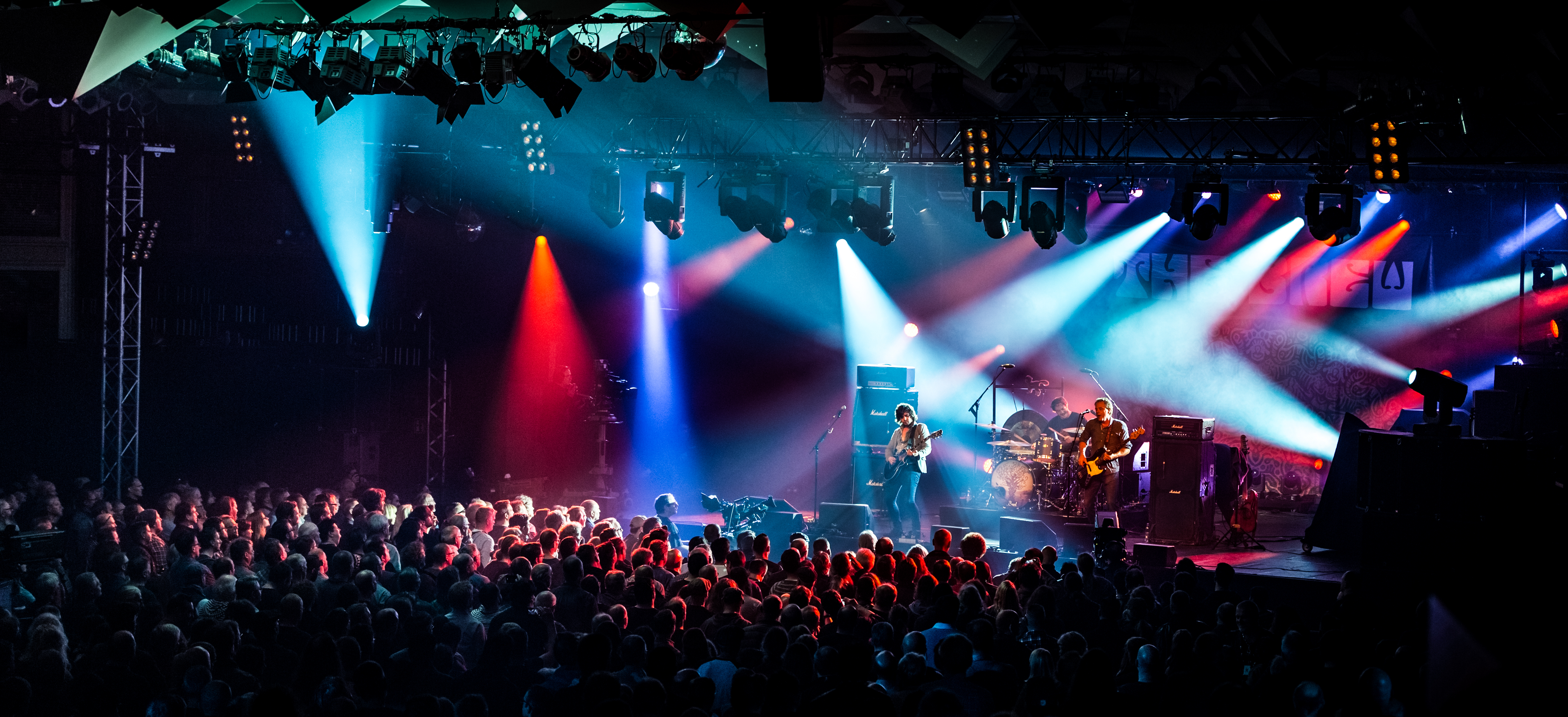
The Brew live at Leverkusener Jazztage 2017

In early July 2007, The Brew headlined the Maasboulevard Festival in Schiedam, the Netherlands and were invited back to perform in 2008.

In 2006, The Brew were a success at The Rock ‘n’ Blues Custom Show at Pentrich, Derbyshire. They were asked to do a second gig by the organisers on the following day on the Centre Stage, and they were then booked to return in 2007. In August that year The Brew performed on The British Stage at the UK’s biggest R’n’B festival in Colne, Lancashire. In 2008 they headlined the festival on the Sunday, on the British stage.

The Brew completed a set for the national Belgium radio station Classic 21 and were filmed by the national television France 2 for their performance at that year's Festival in France, Le Blues Autour Du Zinc. They have performed at the National Classic 21 Radio Station, RTBF Showcase Festival in Brussels.

In 2009, The Brew received national recognition throughout Germany when their performance at Rockpalast Festival was broadcast across the country and beyond, on WDR TV. They performed again at Rockpalast in 2012 and 2017.

The Brew returned to the recording studio and the result, A Million Dead Stars, was released in January 2010.

== Band lineup ==
The Brew	Jason Barwick - Lead guitar, vocals (born 1989); Tim Smith - Bass guitar, vocals. Father of Kurtis.; Kurtis Smith - Drums, vocals (born 1988)

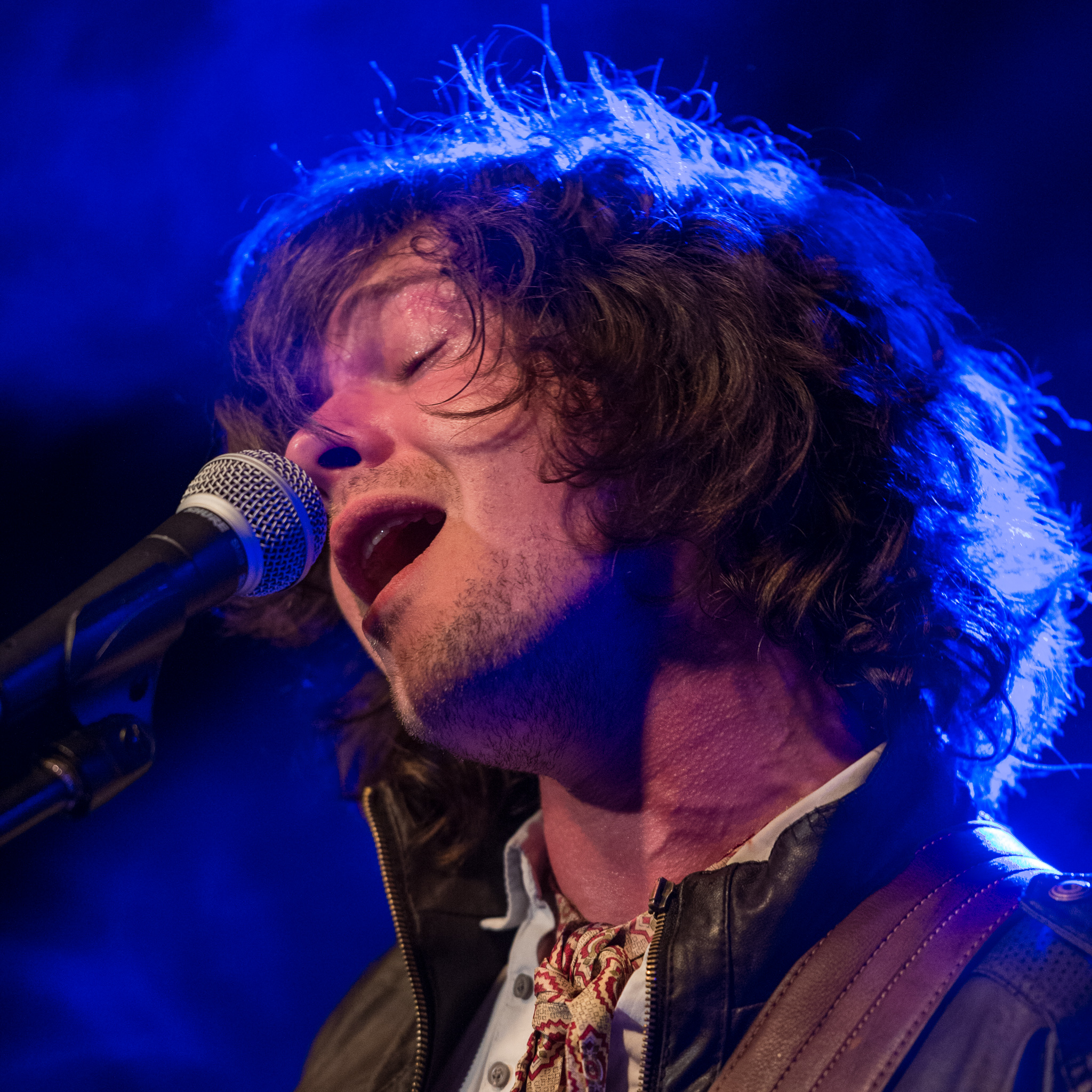
Jason Barwick

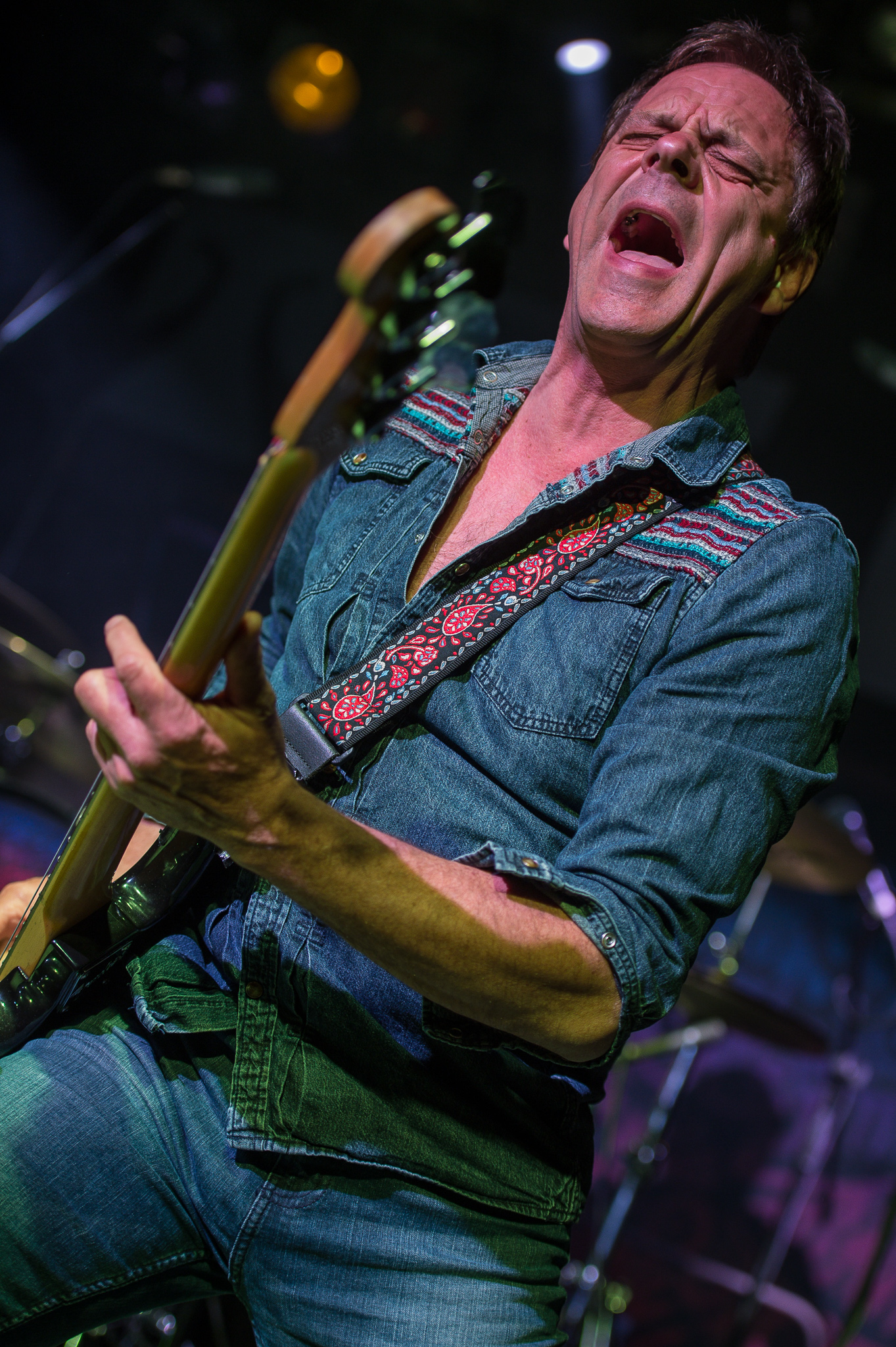
Tim Smith

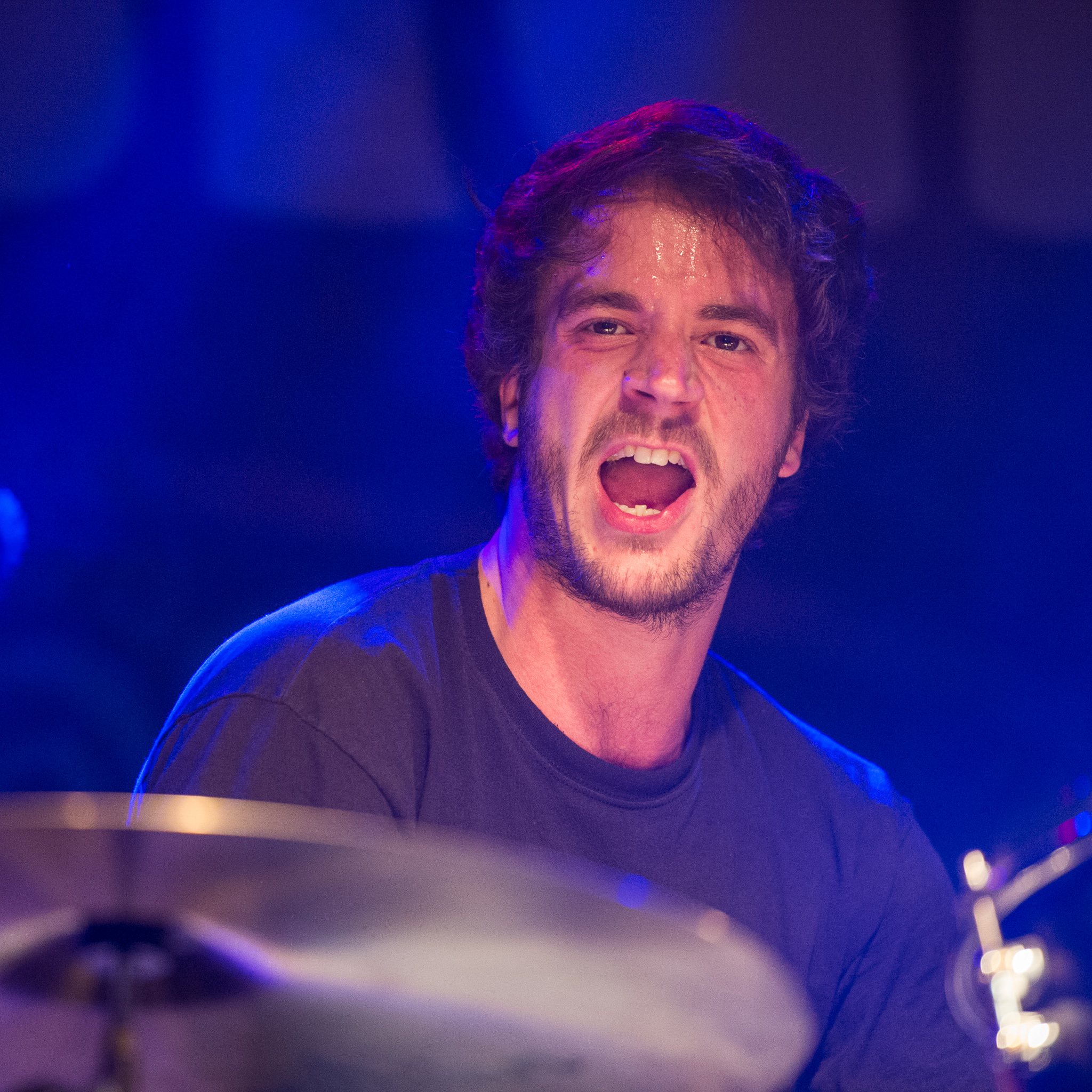
Kurtis Smith

== Discography ==
- The Brew (April 2006)
- Fate and Time E.P. (April 2007)
- The Joker (August 2008)
- Live in Belgium (DVD - 2008)
- A Million Dead Stars (January 2010)
- Live At Luna Lunera (DVD - 2011)
- The Third Floor (September 2011)
- Live in Europe (September 2012)
- Control (February 2014)
- Shake The Tree (September 2016)
- Art Of Persuasion (October 2018)
