= Bure (cloth) =

Heavy woolen woven cloth

Bure was an old heavy woolen woven cloth that has undergone many changes since the Middle Ages. Hence, It was called with many names such as Bura, Burel, Burian, Burly, Burlesque, Burratto, Bournous, Burratine.

== Modifications ==
In ancient Gaul, it was a heavy coarse woolen variety of cloth called ''Bura''. Bure was poor people's cloth in medieval times. Later it was modified to a plain or twilled dress material made with a blended napped fabric made of cotton or hemp yarns in warp and wool on the weft side. Lately, it was made lighter and softer as well.

=== Bureau ===
Bureau is a French word, adopted into English, which evolved from the Burel cloth used for covering desks, to mean the desk, then the physical office, then the administrative department.

== See also ==
- Burel (fabric)
