= Turloughmore =

Turloughmore An Turlach Mór
- Village
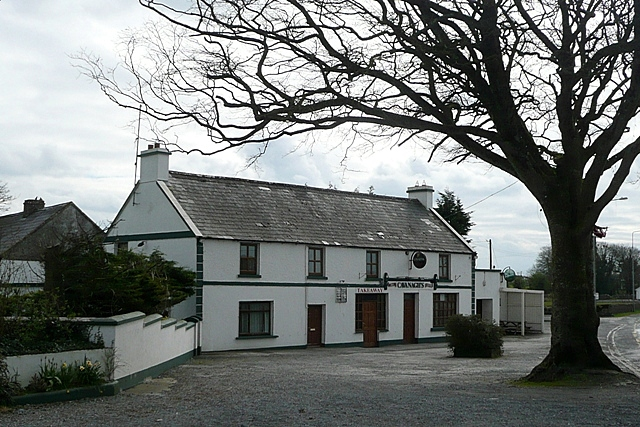

- Location in Ireland
- Coordinates: 53°22′29″N 8°51′53″W
- Country: Ireland
- Province: Connacht
- County: County Galway
- Elevation: 26 m (85 ft)

Population (2022)
  - Total: 243
- Time zone: UTC+0 (WET)
  - Summer (DST): UTC-1 (IST (WEST))
- Irish Grid Reference: M424370

Turloughmore (/tɜːrlɒxˈmɔːr/ tur-lokh-MOR; Irish: an Turlach Mór, meaning 'big lake') is a village in County Galway, Ireland. The name means "the large lake," a notable feature of the area, together with the Clare River (Abhainn an Chláir). Turloughmore lies on the N63 national secondary road.

It is a small village consisting of two petrol stations, three pubs and the base of a bus service company. Turloughmore was designated as a census town by the Central Statistics Office for the first time in the 2016 census. As of the 2022 census, it had a population of 243 people.

The village was once known for the horse fair held there, and for the faction-fighting that occurred at the fair (see John Callaghan (Galway)). The village represents a long-established settlement with a medieval history, and is near the site of the Battle of Knockdoe (Irish Cath Chnoc Tua), a bloody conflict in 1504 between some of the most powerful magnates of the time.

== See also ==
- List of towns and villages in Ireland

== Sources ==
- Blackmore, Liz; John Cronin; Donal Ferrie; Brid Higgins, eds. (2001). In Their Own Words: The Parish of Lackagh-Turloughmore and its People. Galway. ISBN 0-9539834-0-4.
- McCollough, David W., ed. (2000). Wars of the Irish Kings: A Thousand Years of Struggle, from the Age of Myth through the Reign of Queen Elizabeth 1. Crown Publishing Group. ISBN 978-1-4028-9562-3.
