= Bourret =

Bourret can refer to:

- Alex Bourret, hockey player
- Caprice Bourret, model
- Philippe Bourret, badminton player
- René Léon Bourret, French herpetologist and geologist
- Bourret (grape), another name for the French wine grape Terret gris
- Bourret Township, Michigan
- Bourret, Tarn-et-Garonne, France
