= Robert Gardiner =

Robert Gardiner may refer to:

== Politicians ==
- Robert Gardiner (politician) (1879–1945), farmer and federal member of parliament from Canada
- Robert Gardiner (MP for Bristol), see Bristol (UK Parliament constituency)
- Robert K. A. Gardiner (1914–1994), Ghanaian statesman and economist
- Robert Gardiner (judge) (1540–1620), Lord Chief Justice of Ireland, 1586–1604

== Others ==
- Sir Robert Septimus Gardiner (1856–1939), English businessman
- Robert David Lion Gardiner (1911–2004), owner of Gardiners Island
- Robert Gardiner (British Army officer) (1781–1864)
- Robert Hallowell Gardiner (1782–1864), of Gardiner, Maine
- Robert Hallowell Gardiner III (1855–1924), lawyer and ecumenist and descendant of Robert Hallowell Gardiner
- Robert Gardiner (cricketer) (1878–1959), Scottish cricketer and curler
- Robert Gardiner, actor in Maidstone

== See also ==
- Robert Gardner (disambiguation)
- Bob Gardiner (disambiguation)
