= Robert Gardner =

Robert Gardner may refer to:

== Law and politics ==
- Bob Gardner, legislator in Colorado
- Robert Gardner (Victorian politician) (1916–2002), Australian politician
- Robert A. Gardner (politician) (born 1945), Ohio politician
- Bob Gardner (Queensland politician) (1890–1966), member of the Queensland Legislative Assembly

== Sportspeople ==
- Robert Gardner (footballer) (1847–1887), Scottish footballer
- Robert Gardner (golfer) (1890–1956), American golfer and pole vaulter
- Rob Gardner (baseball) (1944–2023), Major League Baseball pitcher

== Musicians ==
- Rob Gardner (musician) (born 1965), rock musician
- Rob Gardner (composer) (born 1978), American composer of primarily oratorios

== Others ==
- Robert Gardner (anthropologist) (1925–2014), director of the Film Study Center, Harvard University
- Robert Gardner (ballet), artistic director of the Minnesota Ballet
- Robert Brown Gardner (1939–1998), American mathematician
- Robert H. Gardner (born 1947), American documentary filmmaker
- Robert W. Gardner (inventor), invented the speed governor used in steam engines; see also Robert W. Gardner House
- R. Wayne Gardner (1894–?), minister, academic, and the president of the Eastern Nazarene College
- Robert J. Gardner (1837–1902), American soldier in the American Civil War
- Robert Waterman Gardner (1866–1937), architect

== See also ==
- Gardner (surname)
- Robert Gardiner (disambiguation)
