= Legends of Shannara =

Book series by Terry Brooks

- Bearers of the Black Staff (2010); The Measure of the Magic (2011)
- Author: Terry Brooks
- Genre: Novels
- No. of books: 2
- Website: www.terrybrooks.net

Legends of Shannara is a series of two fantasy fiction novels by Terry Brooks, published in the United States by Del Rey Books in 2010 and 2011, respectively. It bridges Brooks's Genesis of Shannara series and Shannara series, and covers events taking place 500 years after The Great Wars.

== The books ==
Bearers of the Black Staff (released August 24, 2010) tells of the quest of the eponymous Sider Ament, who, with his companions' help, must protect his home valley from an army of Trolls.

The Measure of the Magic (released August 23, 2011) focuses on Sider Ament's companion Panterra Qu, who inherited the staff in Bearers of the Black Staff, and his efforts to control the ancient artifact's magic.
