= Findo Gask =

Village in Scotland

Coordinates: 56.364°N 3.616°W

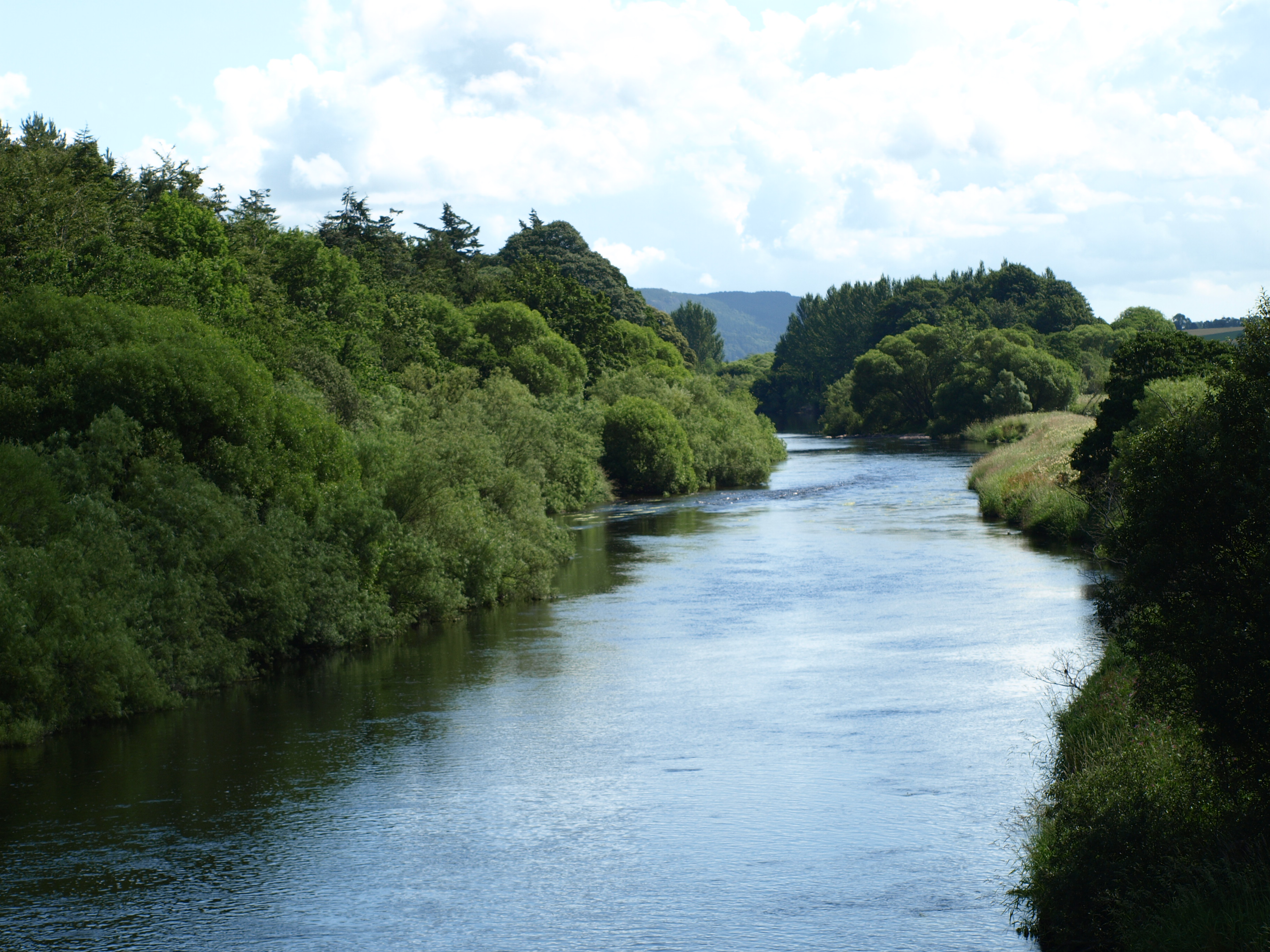
- The River Earn in Findo Gask

- Location within Perth and Kinross
- Council area: Perth and Kinross
- Country: Scotland
- Sovereign state: United Kingdom
- Post town: PERTH
- Postcode district: PH1
- Dialling code: 01738
- Police: Scotland
- Fire: Scottish
- Ambulance: Scottish

Findo Gask is a small village in Perth and Kinross in Scotland, just off the main A9 road. It is in Strathearn.

There are nearby remains associated with the Roman Road to the south and the Roman Frontier on the Gask Ridge.

The area was associated with the family of Laurence Oliphant, and his granddaughter, the songwriter Lady Nairne, was born there.

During the Second World War, units of the Polish Army were stationed at Findo Gask Airfield (now disused).

The woodlands around Findo Gask are known to be excellent sites for the collection of truffles, particularly black truffles, and truffle hunters can often be observed there during certain seasons.

Gask House was built here in 1801 designed by Richard Crichton a pupil of Robert Adam.

== Derivation ==
Gask refers to the nearby Gask Ridge. In Scottish Gaelic, a gasg is a projecting tail or strip of land. The name is shared with other local places including Nether Gask Cottage and Trinity Gask.

Findo is a reference to Fynnoga or Findoca, a saint commemorated in the area. The village was once known as Fyndogask. ("FINDO" is also an aviation waypoint in the vicinity.)

== In popular culture ==
Findo Gask is the name of a demon in Angel Fire East and Armageddon's Children, part of a series of epic fantasy novels by Terry Brooks.

The short story Findo Gask by Elizabeth E. Wein appears in the anthology Concussion published for the 57th British National Science Fiction Convention (April 2006), edited by Bridget Bradshaw, Farah Mendlesohn and Peter Young.

Glasgow-based electropop band Findo Gask are named after the village.

On the Origin of Findo Gask is a book by David McCreight, about the coming of age of a teenager in the Black Isle of Scotland.

== Notable people ==
- Robert Gardiner, cricketer and curler
