= Running with the Demon =

1997 novel by Terry Brooks

- First edition
- Author: Terry Brooks
- Cover artist: Gerald Brom
- Language: English
- Series: Word & Void series
- Genre: Dark fantasy
- Publisher: Del Rey Books
- Publication date: August 19, 1997
- Publication place: United States
- Media type: Print (hardback & paperback)
- Pages: 420 (hardcover edition); 448(paperback edition)
- ISBN: 0-345-37962-4
- OCLC: 36582033
- Dewey Decimal: 813/.54 21
- LC Class: PS3552.R6596 R86 1997
- Followed by: A Knight of the Word

Running with the Demon is a fantasy novel by American writer Terry Brooks, the first book in the Word & Void fantasy series. It was first published in 1997 by Ballantine's Del Rey division. It is followed by the novel A Knight of the Word.

== Plot summary ==
Malevolent creatures have hidden themselves for many years in Sinnissippi Park, in Hopewell, Illinois. A man named John Ross is drawn to the town, plagued by nightmares warning him that an unspeakable evil is about to be unleashed on the world. A teenager, Nest Freemark, has powers that she does not fully understand, and uses them in the battle between good and evil.

== Characters ==
The characters in the book are:

- Nest Freemark
- John Ross
- O'olish Amaneh
- The demon (unnamed)

== Errors ==
There are a few errors in Brooks' novel.

Dates given in Terry Brooks' subsequent novel Armageddon's Children confirm that Running with the Demon takes place in 1997. However, like the other books in the Word/Void trilogy, the days of the week mentioned in the novel do not fall on the given calendar dates.

Another discrepancy is associated with the character Derry Howe, described as a veteran of the Vietnam War, serving two tours of duty. A news article gives his age as 38 years old. The story takes place in 1997, indicating that Derry would have been 16 years old at the time the Vietnam War ended in 1975. However, it also says he is "on the downside of forty."

A third error is given when Nest is said to be training for the Summer Olympics to be held in Melbourne, Australia. The next upcoming Summer Olympics in 2000 were in Sydney, Australia, not Melbourne.

== Reception ==
Though the book was "undermined by unsurprising story developments and therefore little or no narrative tension" Kirkus still commended by noting that it had an "intriguing and well-balanced scenario with believable characters."
