= Philip Knapton =

English organist and composer

Philip Knapton (20 October 1788 – 20 June 1833) was an English organist and composer, active in the musical life of York.

== Life ==
Knapton was born in York in 1788, son of Samuel Knapton, an organist and double bass player, and a music publisher. He received his musical education at Cambridge, studying under Charles Hague, but did not graduate from the university.

He returned to York, where he was a resident until his death. In about 1812 he became organist of St Saviour's Church, York, the first after the installation of the organ. Soon afterwards, feeling that psalmody had fallen into neglect, he produced A Collection of Tunes for Psalms and Hymns, Selected as a Supplement to those now used in several Churches in York and its Vicinities, published in York in 1816; he selected tunes that he considered had neither a "gloomy style" nor a "light and indecorous style". It went into at least three editions.

He was one of the assistant conductors at the York festivals of 1823, 1825, and 1828.

Knapton composed several overtures, piano concertos, and other orchestral works, and arranged a number of fantasias on well-known airs for piano and for piano and harp.

His piano arrangement of Carolina Nairne's song "Caller Herrin'" enjoyed considerable popularity, as did his music for the song "There be none of Beauty's Daughters", which was reviewed in 1820: "This song is more happily conceived than any that has for some time fallen under our observation. It displays a pregnancy of imagination and a propriety of thought.... The opening is one of those melodious passages, short but attractive, which fasten at once on the fancy, and fix themselves in the memory. Once heard, it haunts you for the day, and comes continually without being called.... Neither the contrivance nor the execution of this song are common place... it evinces a more than ordinary share of the fancy and the feeling which united with science, are the qualities which conduct a composer to distinction."
