= The Gypsy Morph =

2008 novel by Terry Brooks

- First edition cover
- Author: Terry Brooks
- Language: English
- Series: The Genesis of Shannara
- Genre: Fantasy
- Publisher: Del Rey Books
- Publication date: August 26, 2008
- Publication place: United States
- Media type: Print (hardback)
- ISBN: 978-0-345-48414-7
- OCLC: 191922662
- Dewey Decimal: 813/.54 22
- LC Class: PS3552.R6596 G97 2008
- Preceded by: The Elves of Cintra
- Followed by: Bearers of the Black Staff

The Gypsy Morph is a fantasy novel by American writer Terry Brooks, the third in his trilogy entitled The Genesis of Shannara, which bridges the events of Brooks' Word & Void series with his Shannara series. It takes place in an apocalyptic world around the year 2100 and immediately follows the novel The Elves of Cintra. It details events during the Great Wars, a historical conflict referenced frequently in the Shannara books. It debuted at #2 on the New York Times Best Sellers Fiction List. The novel's title is a play on the 'Gipsy Moth' light aircraft.

== Plot summary ==
Angel Perez is found by Kirisin and Simralin, and brought to the blind elven tracker Larkin Quill for healing. Leaving Angel, Kirisin and Simralin use a hot-air balloon to travel to the elven city of Arborlon where they discover a demon army hiding outside the city, waiting for the order to attack. The two manage to evade the demon army and enter the city where they gain an audience with the elven High Council. The King is still skeptical about the danger awaiting Arborlon until it is violently revealed in the Council that the elven tracker Tragen is a demon in disguise. Tragen is killed and the elven King is finally convinced that the Arborlon and its guardian tree, the Ellcrys, must be transported within the Loden Elfstone to a safe location.

Meanwhile, the Ghost tribe is reunited with Hawk, Tessa, and Cheney. Hawk uses his magic to heal the comatose Logan Tom who has a vision in which he is instructed to help the elves bring the Loden to safety. Logan leaves the ghosts and, with the help of an Owl named Trim, finds Arborlon. There, he meets, and falls in love with, Simralin. Kirisin then uses the magic of the Loden to encase the entire city and most of its inhabitants within the small stone. Simralin, the King, and a small contingent of elves hold off the demon attackers so that Logan can help Kirisin escape with the stone. Simralin and her companions are separated from Logan and Kirisin, but not before Kirisin gives Simralin the blue Seeking Elfstones for protection. Kirisin is later captured by flying demons called Skrails, but manages to drop the Loden before he is taken to the demon camp. After a frightening interrogation by the demon commander, Findo Gask, Kirisin is rescued by Logan. They then make their way to the camp of refugees led by Helen Rice.

After being healed by Larkin Quill, Angel and Larkin encounter a monstrous demon called the Klee which was sent by Findo Gask. The demon kills Larkin then suddenly flees. Angel leaves and travels towards the refugee camp.

As the Ghosts move eastward Tessa reveals that she is pregnant with Hawk's child. After a skirmish with some militia, they are then attacked by the Klee. Hawk finds he can use his magic to make himself invisible, and after a struggle with the Ghosts, the Klee flees again. The Ghosts eventually return to the refugee camp, with the Klee secretly following.

Logan, Angel, and the Ghosts are reunited at the camp. Logan and Angel leave in search of the Loden, which they find in the grasp of a fallen elf comrade. They return to the camp and make preparations to defend the main bridge across the Columbia River against the advancing demon army. They hope this will give the refugees time to put some distance from their demon pursuers as they escape. After defending the position as long as possible, the order is given to blow up the bridge. However, the detonation mechanism fails. Fixit, a member of the Ghosts, manages to repair it and is killed instantly in the following explosion.

While searching for the Klee, Logan Tom finds Simralin, who recounts her narrow escape from the demons. They affirm their love for each other and return to the camp. The Klee, meanwhile, using its shape shifting ability tricks Hawk and Tessa to leave the camp to kill them. Candle senses the danger and brings Angel Perez, the wolf-dog Cheney, and several Ghosts to the rescue. Together they succeed in destroying the Klee.

Catalya, a human who is slowly turning into a Lizard due to radiation exposure, decides to leave the camp and travel the world on her own before she completes her transformation. She is worried that the Ghosts will reject her in her misshapen form. Panther uses Cheney to track her, and the three ultimately decide to travel north together on their own, choosing to live their lives in the wilderness.

When the demon army eventually catches up with the refugee caravan, Hawk uses his magic to create a massive earthquake which swallows the demon forces. Findo Gask, riding a Skrail, confronts Hawk and Angel and cripples both. Logan and Simralin return in time and Logan engages Findo. Just when it seems Findo has won, Simralin uses the Seeking Elfstones to weaken him, giving Logan the chance to deal the finishing blow.

The caravan continues eastward towards the mountains for weeks, picking up equipment and groups of travelers, including various mutants, along the way. They finally arrive at a pristine valley and release Arborlon from the Loden. Hawk then leaves his friends and climbs to a lookout point where he uses his magic to generate a mist that encapsulates the entire valley, enveloping him as well. The refugees are protected from the nuclear winter that occurs when a military officer, gone mad from being trapped within a nuclear missile bunker, launches all of the weapons.

The world outside Arborlon is devastated, while the refugees remain safe in the valley within the bubble of Hawk's wild magic. An unknown time later, Hawk emerges from the mist, now drained of his magic powers, and heads back into the valley in search of his old life.

== Characters ==
Characters not present in the earlier books of the series include:

- Major Adman Wills, an officer at the Deep Rock command center
- Abramson, an officer at the Deep Rock command center
- Perlo, an officer at the Deep Rock command center
- Anders/Andrews, an officer at the Deep Rock command center
- Aronez, an officer at the Deep Rock command center
- Graham/Graves, an officer at the Deep Rock command center
- Calyx, the demon leading the attack on the elves of the Cintra
- Dariogue, demon charged with executing & mutilating Calyx and his accompanying skrails.
- Unnamed girl who approached Logan Tom for help while he was traveling south-southeast to assist the elves.
