= The Rowan Tree =

Traditional Scottish folk song

The Rowan Tree is a traditional Scottish folk song by Carolina Nairne. An early publication occurred in 1843.

It is sung as part of the 2022 film Living by the lead character.
