= Wu Shujuan =

Chinese painter

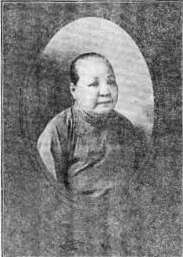
- Born: 1853; She County
- Died: 1930 (aged 76–77)
- Occupation: Painter
- Spouse(s): Tang Guangzhao
- Children: Tang Xiong
- Parent(s): Wu Hongxun

Wu Shujuan (Chinese:吳淑娟; 1853 – 1930), also known by the art names Xingfen nüshi (杏芬女士) and Xingfen laoren, was a late Qing Dynasty painter.

Wu Shujuan was born in 1853 in She County, Anhui. She was the daughter of Wu Hongxun (吳鴻勛), also known as Wu Zijia (吳子嘉), an advisor to Zeng Guofan (曾國藩) and a skilled painter of bamboo, orchids, flowers, and birds. At the age of fifteen, she married Tang Guangzhao (唐光照), an imperial official and scholar who eventually reached the rank of daotai. Their son Tang Xiong (唐熊) was an accomplished painter and calligrapher.

Wu Shujuan was a celebrated painter of flowers and landscapes. She travelled and hiked extensively to paint scenic spots. Her works included Shiba sheng mingsheng tu (Scenic spots in eighteen provinces), Xihu tu (West Lake), and Huangshan tu (Mount Huang). She took two years to complete her long scroll painting Baihua tu (One Hundred Flowers 百花圖, 1881). Her skill was such that she was often paired with the leading Shanghai flower painter Wu Changshuo as "the two Wus". One painting by her that departs from her usual subject matter is Female Immortals (1909) in the Metropolitan Museum of Art, which depicts two figures, one of which is the Daoist deity Magu.

She and her husband published two books, a catalogue of their personal art collection, Ancient and Modern Paintings (Hudie qiuzhai suozang huace 蝴蜨 秋齋所藏畫, 1882), and a book reproducing Baihua tu (One Hundred Flowers.

Of the hundred Chinese painters selected to participate in the 1911 International Exhibition of Art in Rome, Wu Shujuan was the only prize-winner. Reportedly Queen Elena was so taken with Wu Shujuan's work that she purchased it for the Italian royal collection.

On Wu Shujuan's 70th birthday in 1922, she was honored by Chinese President Li Yuanhong.

The Wu Shujuan crater on Mercury is named for her.

== Bibliography ==
- Wu Gan 吳淦. Hudie qiuzhai suocang huace 蝴蜨秋齋所藏畫冊 (Painting album of works held at the Butterfly Autumn Hut). Japan: Akashi Chūshichi, 1882.
- Wu, Shujuan (吳淑娟) and Kunhua Tang (唐昆華). Baihua tu (百花圖). 1898.
