= Thomas Pitcairn =

Scottish Presbyterian minister

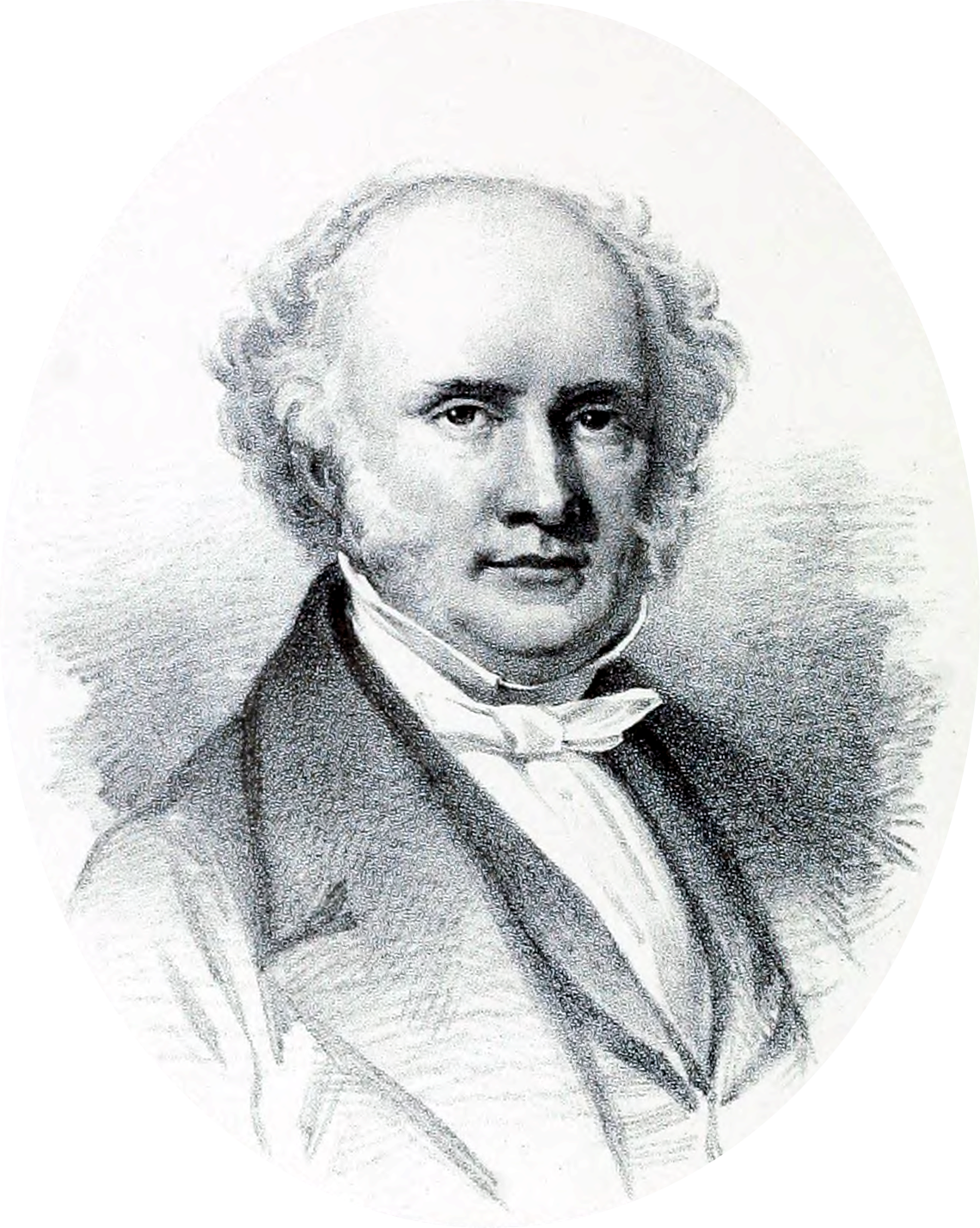
- Thomas Pitcairn from Disruption Worthies

Personal details
- Born: 5 February 1800
- Died: 21 December 1854 (aged 54)

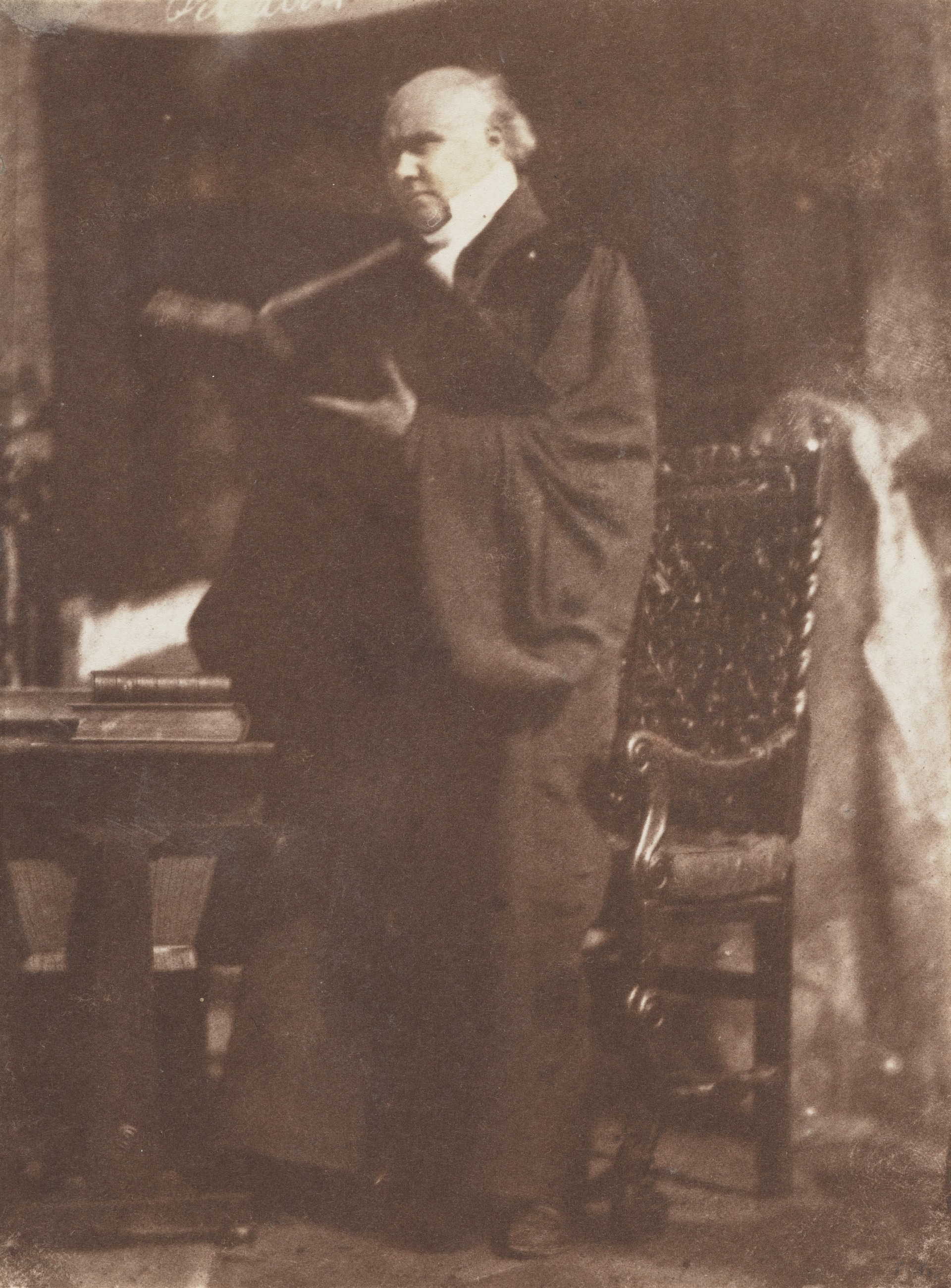
Principal Clerk to the General Assembly of the Free Church of Scotland by Hill & Adamson

Thomas Pitcairn (1800 – 1854) was a Presbyterian minister at Cockpen in the parish of Dalkeith. He is remembered for his being elected Clerk of the Free Church General Assembly during the early days of, the Free Church of Scotland. He was the subject of a portrait by Hill & Adamson.

== Early life and ministry ==
Thomas Cairns was born at Edinburgh on 6 February 1800. His father, Alexander Pitcairn, was a merchant in Leith and Edinburgh, and was an elder in Lady Glenorchy's Chapel, where Dr Jones ministered as pastor for more than fifty years. After finishing the usual literary curriculum at college, he gave himself for a time to business, but he later abandoned this profession. He then studied for the ministry, being trained through the Edinburgh Divinity Hall he was licensed by the Presbytery to preach on 26 March 1828. While a probationer, he assisted successively Dr Stewart of Erskine, and William Thomson of Perth; and thereafter was ordained assistant and successor to Dr Grierson of Cockpen.

== Church of Scotland ministry ==
Cockpen is in the Presbytery of Dalkeith. Pitcairn found work to do among a population partly rural and partly connected with the collieries of the neighbourhood. His preaching was reported as being solid and scriptural. In 1837, he was chosen to be Clerk to the Synod of Lothian and Tweeddale. Then came the days of trial to the Church of Scotland, which led to the Disruption of 1843. A Convocation was held at Edinburgh, on 17 November 1842, at which all those ministers who later left the established church were present, more than four hundred and fifty. Thomas Chalmers preside, and Pitcairn was chosen as clerk. When, next year, the Disruption did take place, Pitcairn was again chosen, along with Patrick Clason of Edinburgh, to the Clerkship of the Free Church General Assembly.

== Free Church ministry ==
The people of Cockpen who left the Established Church with Pitcairn built for him a church at Bonnyrigg, in the same parish, where he ministered to the day of his death.

== Death and legacy ==
In 1854, Pitcairn became ill. He died on 21 December 1854. When the Commission of the Free Church Assembly met in March following, they recorded "the affectionate respect entertained for their departed brother;" saying "that, in no small measure, the Free Church has been indebted to him for much of what is good in the tone and character of the proceedings of her supreme court, and in the general conduct of her ecclesiastical affairs."

He is buried in the Grange Cemetery, Edinburgh.

== Family ==
He married, 7 June 1836, his cousin, Ann Hay (died 28 April 1862), daughter of Young Trotter of Cruicksfield, Berwickshire and had issue —

- Alexander Young, W.S., born 5 April 1837
- Thomas, died in infancy
- Jane Cranstoun, born 17 January 1840, died 2 October 1841.
