= Living (2022 film) =

Film by Oliver Hermanus

- Theatrical release poster
- Directed by: Oliver Hermanus
- Screenplay by: Kazuo Ishiguro
- Based on: Ikiru (1952 film) by: Akira Kurosawa; Shinobu Hashimoto; Hideo Oguni
- Produced by: Stephen Woolley; Elizabeth Karlsen
- Starring: Bill Nighy; Aimee Lou Wood; Alex Sharp; Tom Burke
- Cinematography: Jamie D. Ramsay
- Edited by: Chris Wyatt
- Music by: Emilie Levienaise-Farrouch
- Production companies: Number 9 Films; Ingenious Media; Film4; BFI
- Distributed by: Lionsgate UK
- Release dates: 21 January 2022 (Sundance); 4 November 2022 (UK)
- Running time: 102 minutes
- Country: United Kingdom
- Language: English
- Box office: $12.4 million

Living is a 2022 British historical drama film directed by Oliver Hermanus from a screenplay by Kazuo Ishiguro. It is an English-language remake of the 1952 Akira Kurosawa film Ikiru. Set in 1953 London, it stars Bill Nighy as a bureaucrat in the public works department who learns he has a fatal illness. The film co-stars Aimee Lou Wood, Alex Sharp, and Tom Burke.

Living had its world premiere at the Sundance Film Festival on 21 January 2022, and was released in the UK on 4 November 2022, by Lionsgate. The film received positive reviews, with Nighy's performance receiving particular acclaim. At the 95th Academy Awards, Living received two nominations: Best Actor for Nighy and Best Adapted Screenplay for Ishiguro.

== Plot ==
Rodney Williams is a senior London County Council bureaucrat in 1953 London. He sits at his desk surrounded by piles of paperwork and seems uninspired. A group of women, led by Mrs. Smith, have petitioned the council to redevelop a World War II bomb site into a children's playground. They are sent with their petition from department to department with a newer employee, Mr. Wakeling. Despite Wakeling's enthusiasm, he is stymied by bureaucracy at every step. The petition makes the usual circular rounds and ends back with Williams, who returns it to his pile of paperwork and makes clear to his colleagues his intention to take no further action.

When Williams receives a terminal cancer diagnosis, he attempts unsuccessfully to tell his son, Michael, and daughter-in-law, Fiona. Williams then chooses to withdraw half of his life savings, purchase a lethal amount of sleeping medicine, and commit suicide in a seaside resort town. Finding himself unable to go through with it, he gives the sleeping medicine to Mr. Sutherland, an insomniac writer he meets in a café. Moved by Williams's story, Sutherland takes him for a night on the town, where Williams replaces his traditional bowler hat with a fedora after a prostitute steals his bowler hat. The pair go to bars, sing, drink heavily, and attend a striptease/burlesque show.

Returning to London but not to work, Williams runs into Miss Margaret Harris, a young former subordinate who took up a position at a Lyon's Corner House restaurant while he was away. Williams's nosy neighbour spots the pair having lunch at the high-end restaurant Fortnum's and tells Fiona, who demands Michael speak to his father about the potential scandal. Meanwhile, Williams attempts to tell Michael about his diagnosis, but neither finds themselves able to bring up what they need to talk about.

As Williams's health worsens, he attempts to spend more time with Harris, whose youthful vigour he envies and would like to regain before he dies. Realising the best way to spend his remaining time is to do some good, Williams rallies the various departments to approve the construction of the children's playground. During this time, through their mutual respect for Williams, Harris and Wakeling have grown fond of each other and are seen taking walks and sitting in parks together.

Although he is able to push the process through by standing up to his colleagues and superiors, Williams dies shortly after construction is finished. At his funeral, well-attended by the people he has helped, Michael guesses that Williams had told Harris about his diagnosis but not him.

Inspired by Williams's actions, his former colleagues pledge to uphold his example and become advocates for positive change but soon revert to their old bureaucratic ways. Wakeling, who joined the office shortly before Williams's diagnosis, reads a letter left for him by Williams instructing him to remember the playground when he gets discouraged. Visiting the playground, Wakeling meets a police officer who tells him that he saw Williams there shortly before he died, rocking in the swing in the snow and singing the Scottish folk song "The Rowan Tree". The constable feels guilty that he let Williams sit in the cold in his condition. Wakeling consoles the officer, saying Rodney Williams was probably happier in that moment than he had been for a long time.

== Cast ==
- Bill Nighy as Rodney Williams
- Aimee Lou Wood as Margaret Harris
- Alex Sharp as Peter Wakeling
- Tom Burke as Sutherland
- Adrian Rawlins as Middleton
- Hubert Burton as Rusbridger
- Oliver Chris as Hart
- Michael Cochrane as Sir James
- Anant Varman as Singh
- Zoe Boyle as Mrs. McMasters
- Lia Williams as Mrs. Smith
- Jessica Flood as Mrs. Porter
- Patsy Ferran as Fiona
- Barney Fishwick as Michael, Williams’ son
- Nichola McAuliffe as Mrs. Blake
- Celeste Dodwell as Mrs Matthews

== Production ==
In October 2020, the project was announced with Nobel Prize-winning novelist Ishiguro as screenwriter, and Nighy and Wood attached to star. In December 2020, Lionsgate acquired the UK distribution rights. In June 2021, principal photography began in the UK, Sharp and Burke were announced to have joined the film, and the first image from the film was released. It was also announced that Toho, the distributor of the original film, had acquired the rights for Japan. London's County Hall provided the backdrop for the film; in addition, the film was co-financed through the County Hall Arts charity.

== Release ==
The film premiered at the 2022 Sundance Film Festival on 21 January 2022. Shortly after, Sony Pictures Classics acquired distribution rights to the film for North and Latin America, India, Scandinavia, Eastern Europe, Germany, South Africa, Southeast Asia and airlines worldwide for around $5 million in an auction that also included Neon, Bleecker Street and Focus Features among others. Living screened at the 66th BFI London Film Festival in October 2022 and at the TCL Chinese Theatre as part of the 2022 AFI Fest on 6 November 2022. The film was released theatrically in the United Kingdom on 4 November 2022, and had a limited theatrical release in the United States on 23 December 2022. As part of Sony's first-window deal with Netflix in the United States, the movie streamed from 5 June 2023.

== Reception ==
=== Critical reception ===
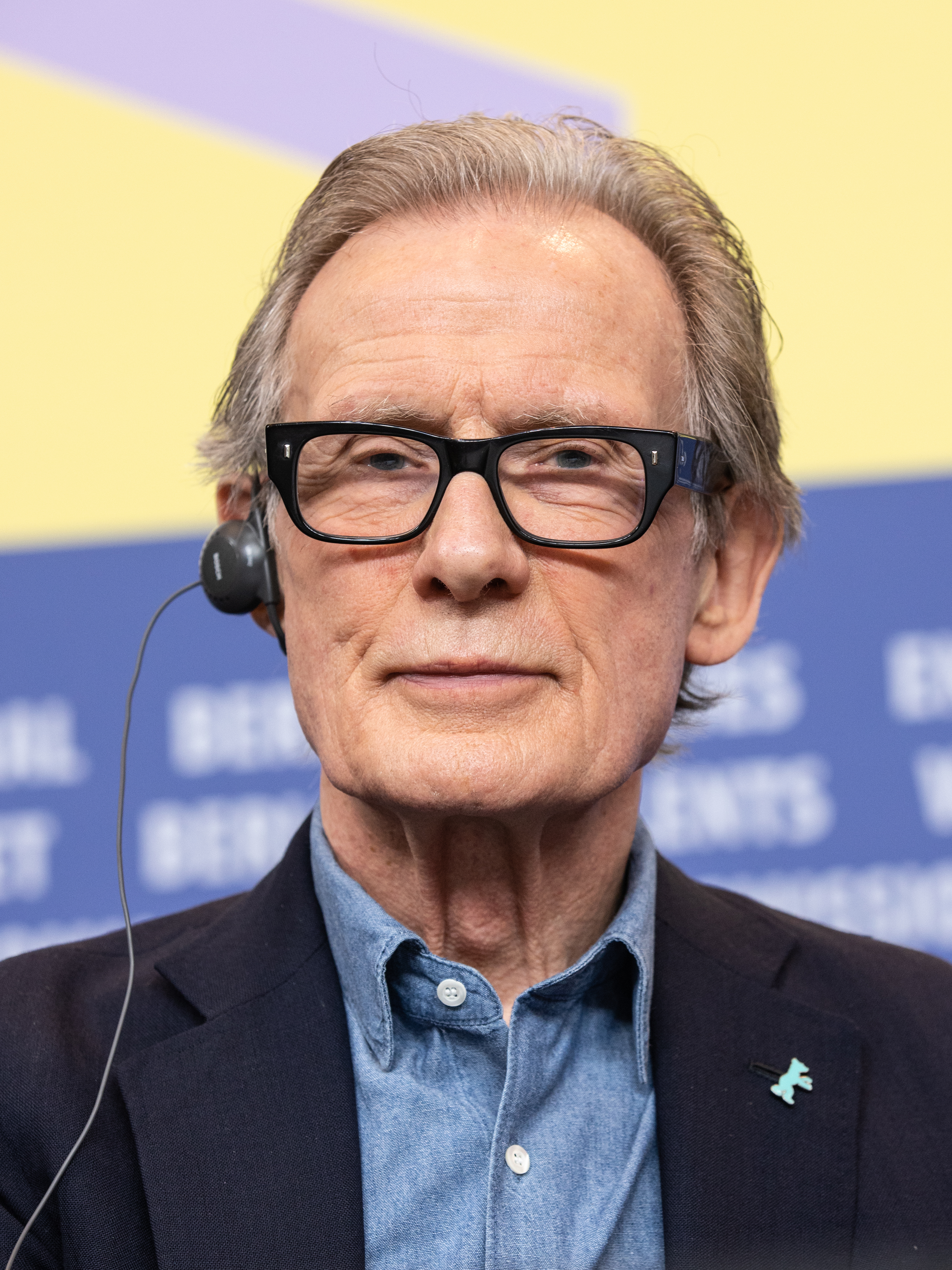
Bill Nighy garnered critical acclaim for his performance and earned an Academy Award nomination for Best Actor.

On the review aggregator website Rotten Tomatoes, 96% of 223 critics' reviews are positive. The website's consensus reads: "Living sets a high bar for itself in setting out to remake a Kurosawa classic—and director Oliver Hermanus and star Bill Nighy clear it in triumphant fashion." Metacritic, which uses a weighted average, assigned the film a score of 81 out of 100, based on 40 critics, indicating "universal acclaim".

Matt Zoller Seitz of RogerEbert.com gave the film three out of four stars and wrote, "Living isn't a great movie—it's a little too subdued at times and has a tendency to fixate on Williams' mostly unarticulated sadness—but it's consistently involving." There's an argument to be made he missed the point of the movie.

Richard Roeper of the Chicago Sun-Times also gave the film three out of four stars and wrote, "About two-thirds of the way through the film, Living takes such an abrupt turn that it almost feels as if several key scenes had been inadvertently excised—but then we wind back in time, and all is answered. Throughout, Bill Nighy carries the film effortlessly on his slender shoulders, reminding us of why he's an international treasure."

=== Accolades ===
Award	Date of ceremony	Category	Recipient(s)	Result	Ref.
Hollywood Music in Media Awards	November 16, 2022	Best Original Score in an Independent Film	Emilie Levienaise-Farrouch	Won	
British Independent Film Awards	December 4, 2022	Best British Independent Film	Oliver Hermanus, Kazuo Ishiguro, Stephen Woolley, Elizabeth Karlsen	Nominated	
British Independent Film Awards	December 4, 2022	Best Director	Oliver Hermanus	Nominated	
British Independent Film Awards	December 4, 2022	Best Lead Performance	Bill Nighy	Nominated	
British Independent Film Awards	December 4, 2022	Best Supporting Performance	Aimee Lou Wood	Nominated	
British Independent Film Awards	December 4, 2022	Best Screenplay	Kazuo Ishiguro	Nominated	
British Independent Film Awards	December 4, 2022	Best Casting	Kahleen Crawford	Nominated	
British Independent Film Awards	December 4, 2022	Best Costume Design	Sandy Powell	Nominated	
British Independent Film Awards	December 4, 2022	Best Music Supervision	Rupert Hollier	Nominated	
British Independent Film Awards	December 4, 2022	Best Production Design	Helen Scott	Won	
National Board of Review	December 8, 2022	Top 10 Independent Films	Living	Won	
Los Angeles Film Critics Association	December 11, 2022	Best Lead Performance	Bill Nighy	Won	
Chicago Film Critics Association	December 14, 2022	Best Actor	Bill Nighy	Nominated	
Dallas–Fort Worth Film Critics Association	19 December 2022	Best Actor	Bill Nighy	4th place	
Alliance of Women Film Journalists	5 January 2023	Best Actor	Bill Nighy	Nominated	
National Society of Film Critics	January 7, 2023	Best Actor	Bill Nighy	3rd place	
San Francisco Bay Area Film Critics Circle	January 9, 2023	Best Actor	Bill Nighy	Nominated	
San Francisco Bay Area Film Critics Circle	January 9, 2023	Best Adapted Screenplay	Kazuo Ishiguro	Nominated	
Golden Globe Awards	January 10, 2023	Best Actor in a Motion Picture – Drama	Bill Nighy	Nominated	
Critics' Choice Movie Awards	January 15, 2023	Best Actor	Bill Nighy	Nominated	
Critics' Choice Movie Awards	January 15, 2023	Best Adapted Screenplay	Kazuo Ishiguro	Nominated	
Online Film Critics Society	January 23, 2023	Best Actor	Bill Nighy	Nominated	
London Film Critics' Circle	February 5, 2023	Film of the Year	Living	Nominated	
London Film Critics' Circle	February 5, 2023	British/Irish Film of the Year	Living	Nominated	
London Film Critics' Circle	February 5, 2023	Actor of the Year	Bill Nighy	Nominated	
London Film Critics' Circle	February 5, 2023	British/Irish Actor of the Year (for body of work)	Bill Nighy	Won	
British Academy Film Awards	February 19, 2023	Best Actor in a Leading Role	Bill Nighy	Nominated	
British Academy Film Awards	February 19, 2023	Best Adapted Screenplay	Kazuo Ishiguro	Nominated	
British Academy Film Awards	February 19, 2023	Outstanding British Film	Oliver Hermanus, Elizabeth Karlsen, Stephen Woolley, Kazuo Ishiguro	Nominated	
Screen Actors Guild Awards	February 26, 2023	Outstanding Performance by a Male Actor in a Leading Role	Bill Nighy	Nominated	
Satellite Awards	March 3, 2023	Best Motion Picture – Drama	Living	Nominated	
Satellite Awards	March 3, 2023	Best Actor in a Motion Picture – Drama	Bill Nighy	Nominated	
Satellite Awards	March 3, 2023	Best Adapted Screenplay	Kazuo Ishiguro	Nominated	
Satellite Awards	March 3, 2023	Best Costume Design	Sandy Powell	Nominated	
USC Scripter Awards	4 March 2023	Best Adapted Screenplay – Film	Kazuo Ishiguro	Nominated	
Academy Awards	March 12, 2023	Best Actor	Bill Nighy	Nominated	
Academy Awards	March 12, 2023	Best Adapted Screenplay	Kazuo Ishiguro	Nominated	
