= Wu Shujuan (crater) =

Crater on Mercury

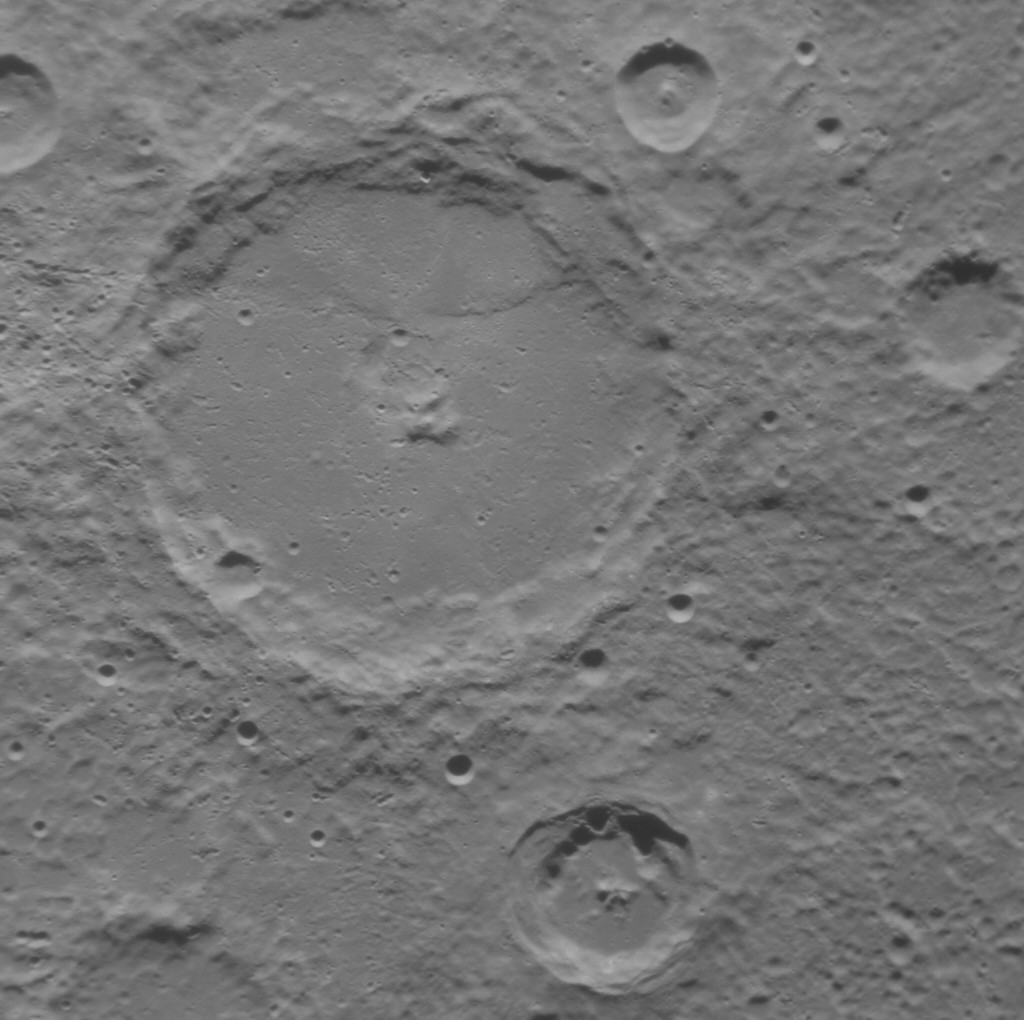
- MESSENGER NAC
- Planet: Mercury
- Coordinates: 70.80°S 346.73°W
- Quadrangle: Bach
- Diameter: 109.0 km (67.7 mi)
- Eponym: Wu Shujuan

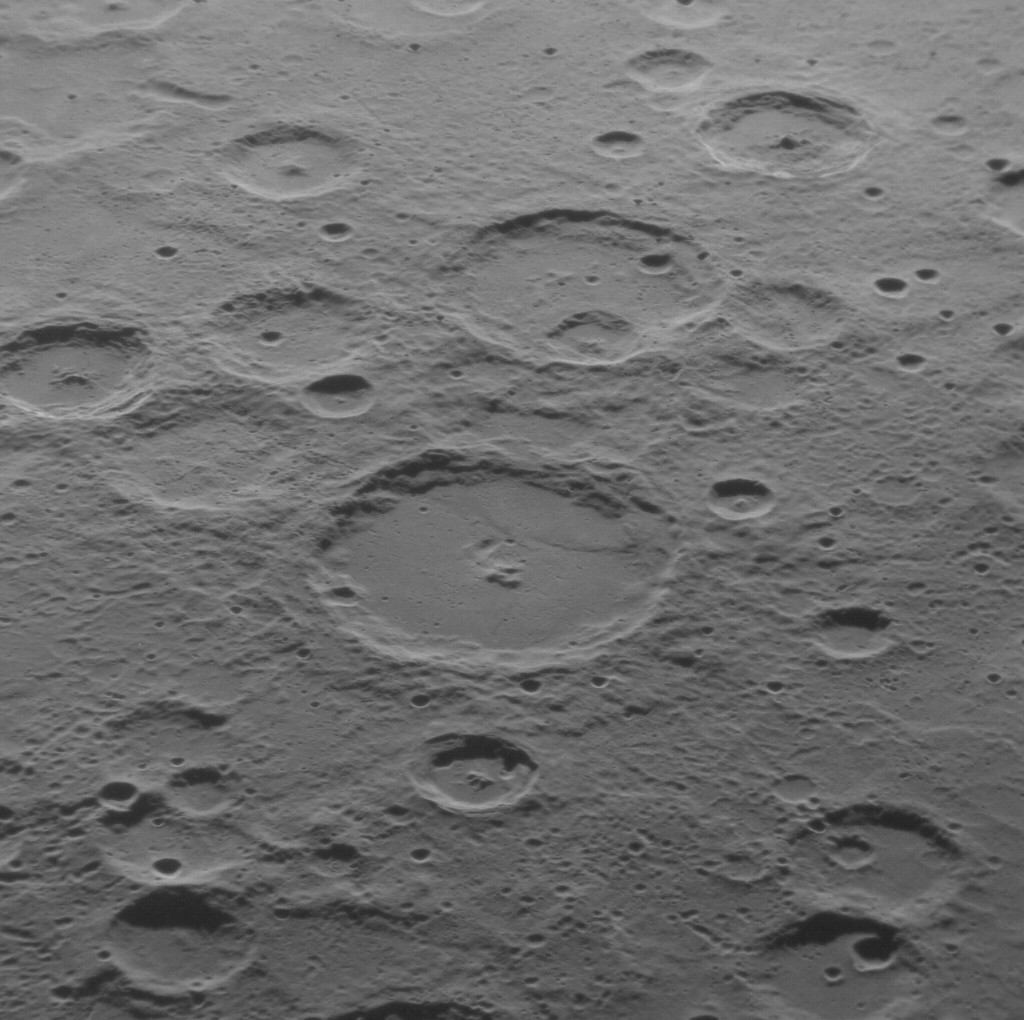
Oblique view with Wu Shujuan at center, and Nairne above left of center

Wu Shujuan is a crater on Mercury. Its name was adopted by the International Astronomical Union (IAU) on November 14, 2024. The crater is named for Chinese painter Wu Shujuan (1853-1930).

Wu Shujuan is east of Nairne crater. El Husseini crater is southeast of Wu Shujuan.
