= A Knight of the Word =

1998 novel by Terry Brooks

- First edition
- Author: Terry Brooks
- Cover artist: Gerald Brom
- Language: English
- Series: Word & Void series
- Genre: Dark fantasy
- Publisher: Del Rey Books
- Publication date: July 28, 1998
- Publication place: United States
- Media type: Print (hardback & paperback)
- Pages: 352
- ISBN: 978-0-345-37963-4
- OCLC: 38311956
- Dewey Decimal: 813/.54 21
- LC Class: PS3552.R6596 K65 1998
- Preceded by: Running with the Demon
- Followed by: Angel Fire East

A Knight of the Word is a fantasy novel by American writer Terry Brooks, the second book in the Word & Void series, a prequel to his Shannara series. It was first published in 1998 by Ballantine's Del Rey division (ISBN 978-0-345-37963-4). The setting is primarily Seattle, Washington around Halloween in 2002, five years after the events of Running with the Demon. The story follows John Ross as he attempts to leave his service to the Word, while Nest Freemark tries to restore his faith. It is followed by the novel Angel Fire East.

== Plot summary ==
John Ross, having failed on a mission from the Word in which fourteen school children were killed in San Sobel, California, tries to leave his life as a Knight of the Word behind him. He returns to the Fairy Glen in Wales to tender his resignation to the Lady, but she refuses to appear to him; Instead, he meets the ghost of his ancestor, Owain Glyndŵr, who tells him that the decision to give up being a Knight is not his to make. Frustrated, John returns to America, where in Boston he meets and instantly falls in love with the beautiful Stefanie, who seems to amply reciprocate his feelings. Deliriously happy, he embarks together with her on a long trek across the United States, culminating with both of them finding work at a homeless center in Seattle. Feeling that he has found a very satisfactory new life, with a loving woman at his side and a demanding job helping an important social cause in cooperation with idealistic, sympathetic activists, he increasingly feels that his time as a Knight of the Word can be relegated to the past. He ignores the infrequent dreams of a demon-haunted future, including one in which he kills his much-beloved boss, Simon Lawrence.

Lawrence is known locally as "the Wizard of Oz" because of his successful charity ventures in Seattle (AKA the Emerald City); by energetic campaigning, and building up a reputation as an idealistic, dedicated activist, Lawrence succeeded in pushing many politicians to support the homeless - though this is not a very popular cause and with little electoral benefit accruing. However, Lawrence's sterling reputation is threatened when he is being investigated for alleged financial impropriety, by a famous reporter named Andrew Wren who is (without his own knowledge) - influenced and manipulated by a demon. This demon is a changeling - during the day it works to subvert, and at night morphs into a giant hyena-like creature to feed on the homeless living in the ruins under modern Seattle.

Nest Freemark, now a 19-year-old college student, has returned to Hopewell, Illinois for the weekend before Halloween. She muses on events over the last five years, including her grandfather's death in the spring, Wraith's disappearance when she turned 18, and the fact that she is no longer in touch with most of her childhood friends (or John Ross). She has not used her magic in years and is unsure if she has it any longer.

She travels with her twiggy sylvan companion, Pick, through the park and has an encounter with the tatterdemalion Ariel, a ghost-like messenger of the Word formed from the memories of dead children. Nest learns that John Ross is in need of her help and reluctantly agrees to fly to Seattle to talk to him. She is disturbed to learn that John is now especially vulnerable to falling to the side of the Void, and the Word has dispatched someone to kill him if this happens. This resounds with Nest, as she recalls John admitting that he would have killed her five years ago if she had been turned to the Void.

Arriving in Seattle, Nest takes a walk at night with Ariel; they hear the demon hunting and killing people in the underground city, but Ariel will not let her pursue it. She meets with John the next day, but cannot convince him to return to his duties as a Knight; however, she does cause changes in his dreams - now John also dreams about killing her. Nest also runs into O'olish Amaneh, the Word-serving Native American that she met five years before, and finds that he is the one sent to kill John if he should turn to the Void.

That night, Ariel informs Nest that Boot, a sylvan in a local park, has seen the demon. Just as they're getting crucial information from Boot, the demon attacks them in its hyena form and kills Boot, his owl Audrey, and Ariel. It chases Nest through a nearby residential area, but she narrowly escapes on a bus. Later that same night, the demon sets fire to the homeless shelter and John and Stefanie rescue many tenants, but one of their coworkers is killed in the fire. John was exceedingly groggy and foggy-headed when Stefanie tried to wake him to help deal with the fire, and he's troubled by this.

The next day, Halloween, John and Nest meet. They share information and decide that Nest should leave town. Andrew Wren, in possession of (demon-provided) evidence that John and Simon are embezzling from the shelter, meets with John and leaves him with the suspicion that Simon is the demon. His suspicions are reinforced when Stefanie tells him that Simon has fired him, to distance himself from the scandal. John heads to a fund-raising event at the art museum and confronts Simon, who reveals himself as a demon, nearly kills John, and leaves him on the floor. John repents for faltering in his service to the Word and is once again infused with magic to heal and strengthen him. He searches for Simon with the intent to kill him, but just as he finds him, Nest intervenes. On the way out of town, she realized that Stefanie is actually the demon, because of parallels between Stefanie's actions and those of Nest's father (also a demon), not to mention the timing issues and other evidence that lead her to this truth. John realizes that he's been subtly led toward the Void ever since Stefanie came into his life, after San Sobel; as a shape-shifting demon, Stefanie forged documents to support the embezzlement accusations, attacked Nest and her friends in the park, set fire to the shelter to explain the wounds she'd sustained trying to kill Nest, lied about John being fired, and morphed into Simon at the museum so John would be tricked into killing the real, innocent Simon and completing his turn to the Void.

Finally, John confronts Stefanie at his apartment. She does not deny being a demon, but tells John that even so he is still in love with her (which he feels to be true) and that she could continue to make him happy. When he rejects the offer, the demon-Stefanie, afraid of his now-returned magic, leaps out a window. Faced with the demon's onslaught when it crashes to the street below, the waiting Nest finds that Wraith has not left her- he lives within her and Nest can assume his form in response to threatening dark magic.

Together, she and John destroy Stefanie - or, in fact, they destroy the shape-changing demon who had taken her form as well as various other forms, human and non-human, male and female. (Though the term is not explicitly used, Stefanie in fact fits well with the traditional depiction of a succubus - a female demon who takes the form of a human woman in order to seduce men.)

Nest returns to Hopewell, and John resumes his service as a Knight of the Word, once again using his dreams of the future to change things in the present and keep the Void at bay.

== Characters ==
- Freemark, Nest
- Ross, John
- O'olish Amaneh
- Winslow, Stefanie
- Wraith
- Lawrence, Simon
- Wren, Andrew
- Hapgood, Ray
- Ariel
- Boot
- Audrey
- Pick
- Benjamin
- Heppler, Robert
- The Lady
- Glyndwyr, Owain
