= Caller Herrin' =

Scottish song

"Caller Herrin' " is a Scottish song, the music by Nathaniel Gow (1763–1831), and the words by Carolina Nairne (1766–1845).

== History ==
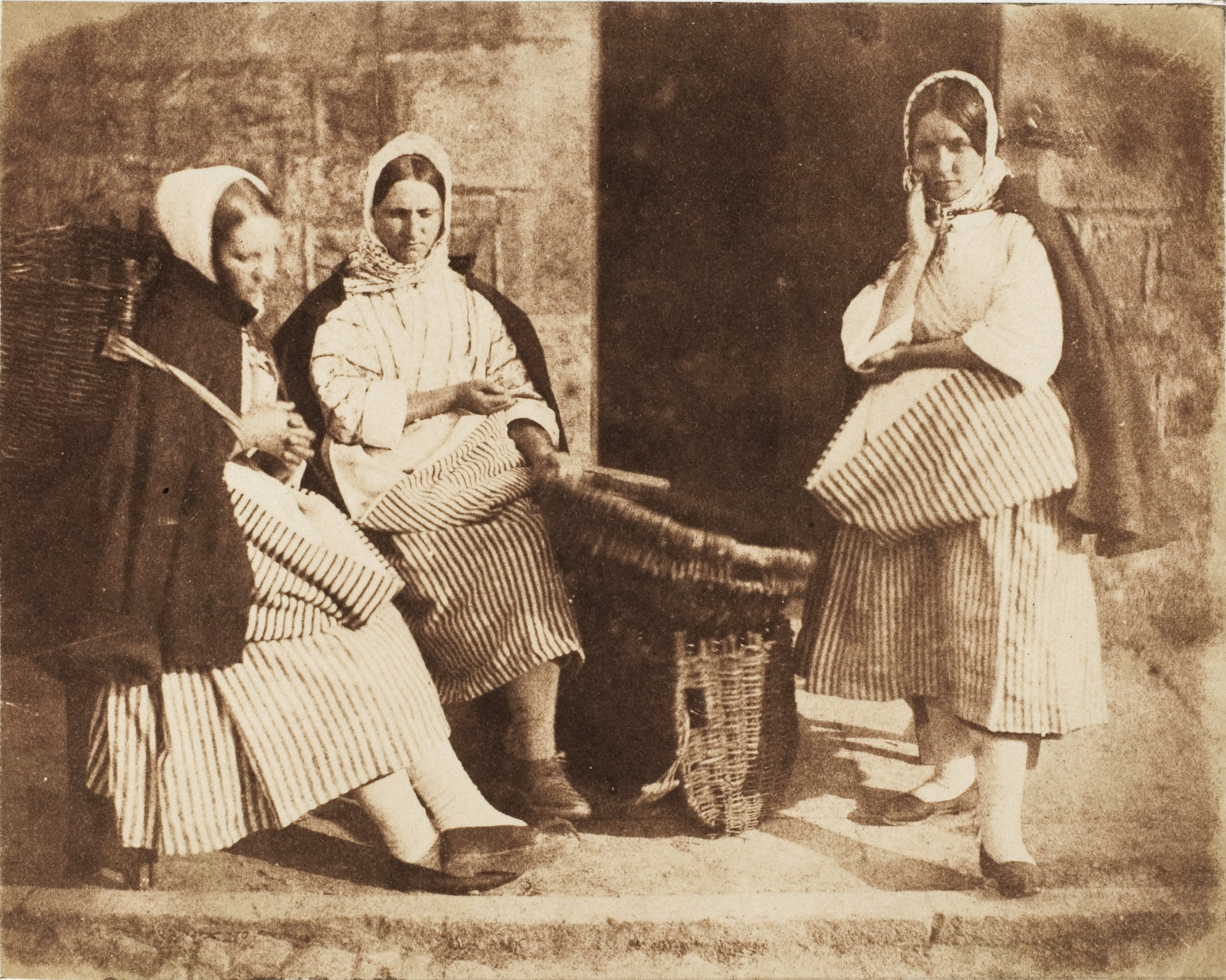
Newhaven fishergirls pose with a creel. Photograph by Hill & Adamson, 1840s.

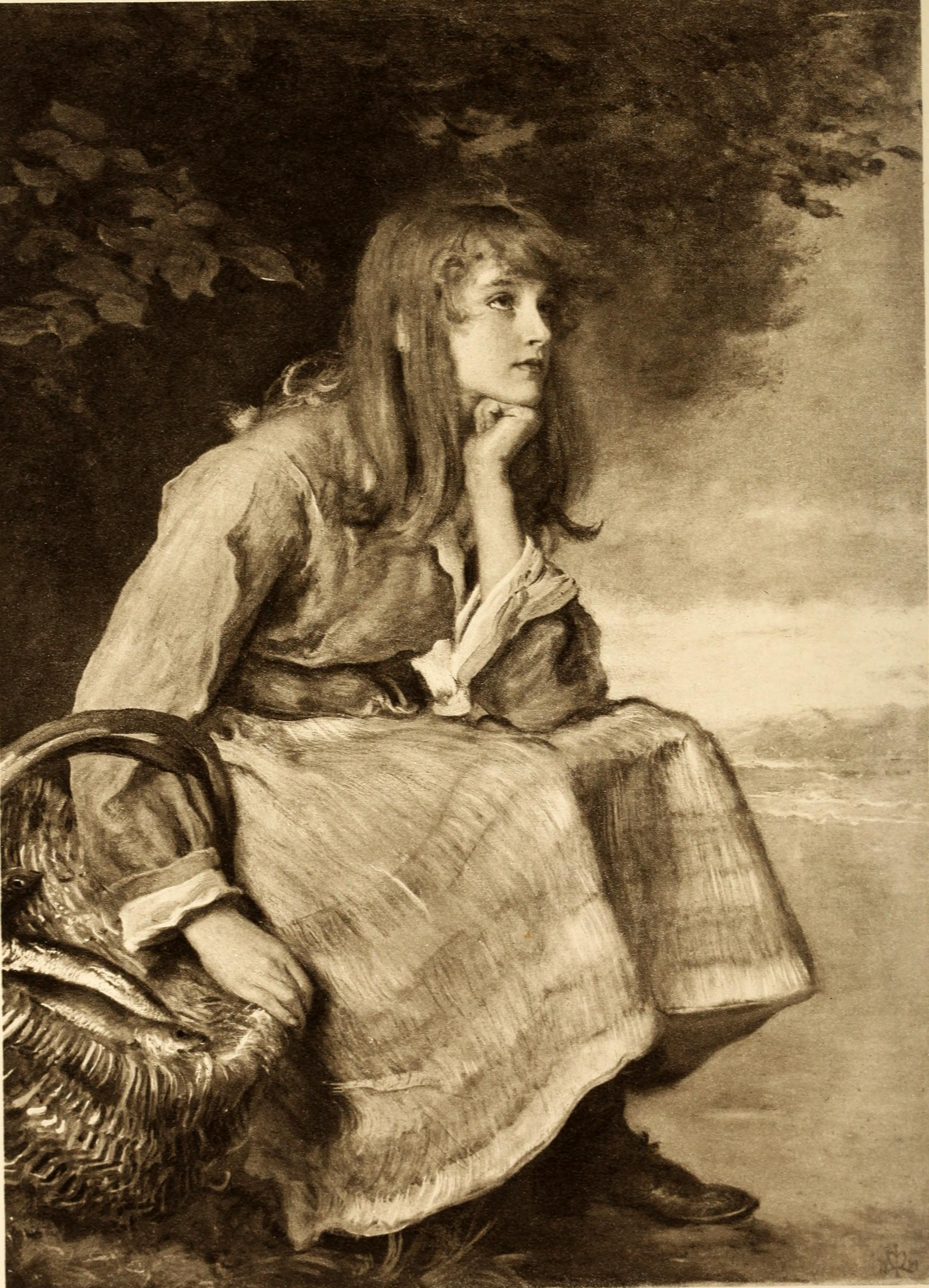
Sir John Everett Millais: Caller Herrin', 1881

"Caller herrin'" means fresh herring. It was the traditional cry of Newhaven fishwives, who carried in creels freshly caught herring which they sold from door to door. Gow, a violinist and bandleader of Edinburgh, incorporated this cry, and also the bells of St Andrew's Church, into his composition, written about 1798. It became one of his best-known tunes.

Carolina Oliphant, Lady Nairne, was a songwriter, using the pseudonym "Mrs Bogan of Bogan". Attending balls in country houses of Perthshire, she heard the music of Nathaniel Gow, and wrote words for "Caller Herrin'".

It has been adapted many times. Philip Knapton composed a set of variations of the tune, for piano or harp, which appeared in 1820 and became popular. Joseph Binns Hart (1794–1844) arranged the tune as a quadrille in his 8th Set of Scotch Quadrilles (1827). The song was translated in 1929, both in language and location, by T. Gwynn Jones, a leading Welsh poet and translator. He called it "Penwaig Nefyn" (Nefyn Herrings), as Nefyn at the time hosted a busy herring fishery, and published it, arranged as a duet, in New Song Book for Schools, Part 1, Llyfr Canu Newydd (1929).

== Music ==
The tune and words of the chorus:

== In literature ==
- In The Ascent of Rum Doodle by W. E. Bowman, Constant the Linguist gives a "passionate rendering" of Caller Herrin' to Travis the Seal with devastating results.
