= The Genesis of Shannara =

Novel series by Terry Brooks

- Armageddon's Children (2006); The Elves of Cintra (2007); The Gypsy Morph (2008)
- Author: Terry Brooks
- Genre: Fantasy
- Publisher: Del Rey Books

The Genesis of Shannara is a series of novels written by American author Terry Brooks.

The first book, Armageddon's Children, was released by Del Rey Books on August 29, 2006, in the United States, and by Orbit Books on September 7, 2006, in the United Kingdom. The novel details the quest of two Knights of the Word in protecting two powerful magics in a post-apocalyptic Earth.

The second book, The Elves of Cintra, was published August 28, 2007. It deals mostly with the Elves first mentioned in Armageddon's Children, continuing the storyline of the two Knights of the Word.

The final book in the trilogy, The Gypsy Morph, was published in August 26, 2008. It deals with the titular Gypsy Morph finding the safe haven from the coming cataclysm to protect those that will populate the new world.

The Genesis of Shannara novels bridge the Word & Void series with the Legends of Shannara series, two other of Brooks' productions. They cover events during The Great Wars, which are alluded to often in the Shannara series.
