= Nairne (crater) =

Crater on Mercury

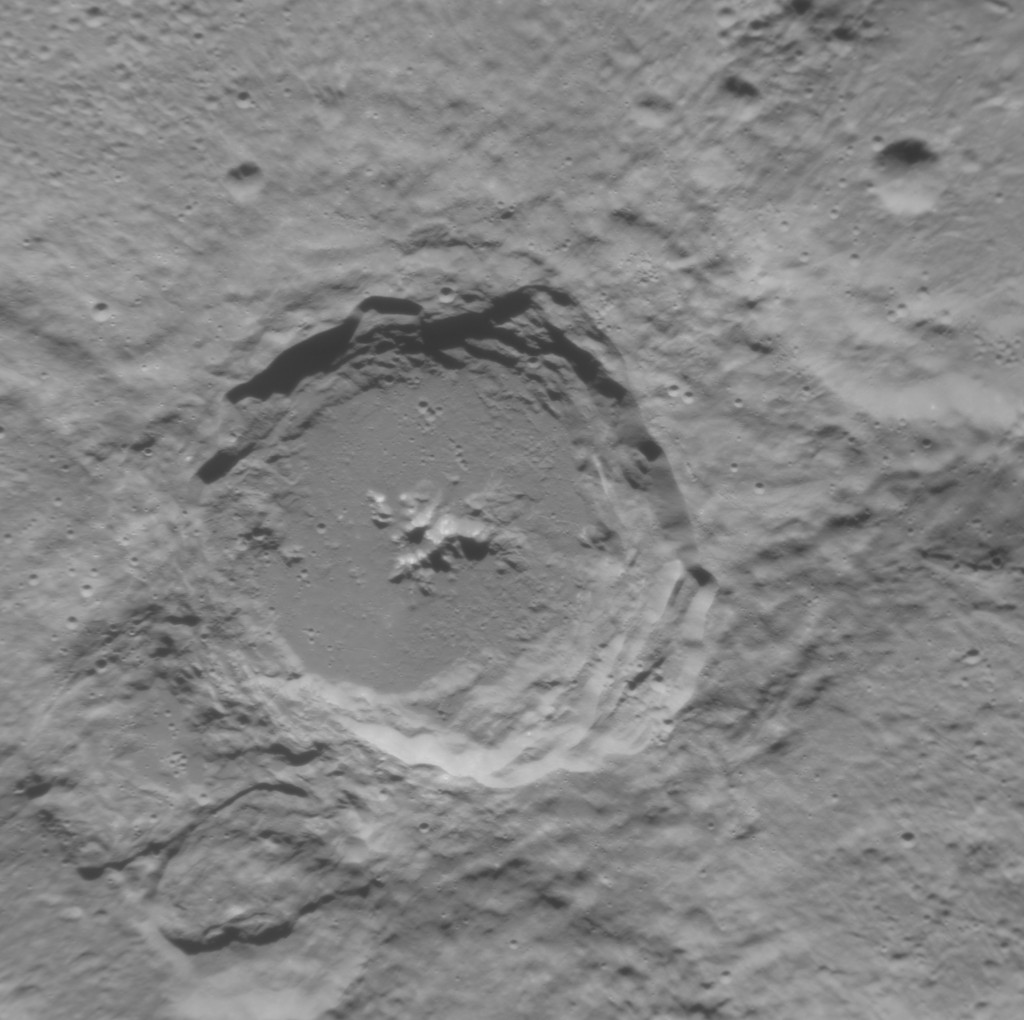
- MESSENGER NAC
- Planet: Mercury
- Coordinates: 70.34°S 1.59°W
- Quadrangle: Bach
- Diameter: 56.0 km (34.8 mi)
- Eponym: Carolina Nairne

Nairne is a crater on Mercury. Its name was adopted by the International Astronomical Union (IAU) in 2022. The crater is named for Scottish songwriter Carolina Nairne.

To the northwest of Nairne is the crater MacNicol, and to the east is the larger Wu Shujuan.
