= The Elves of Cintra =

2007 novel by Terry Brooks

- Cover art of The Elves of Cintra
- Author: Terry Brooks
- Language: English
- Series: The Genesis of Shannara
- Genre: Fantasy
- Publisher: Del Rey Books
- Publication date: August 28, 2007
- Publication place: United States
- Media type: Print (hardback & paperback)
- ISBN: 978-0-345-48411-6
- OCLC: 123029789
- Dewey Decimal: 813/.54 22
- LC Class: PS3552.R6596 E48 2007
- Preceded by: Armageddon's Children
- Followed by: The Gypsy Morph

The Elves of Cintra is a fantasy novel by American writer Terry Brooks, the second in his epic fantasy trilogy The Genesis of Shannara. The series bridges the events of Brooks' Word & Void series with The Sword of Shannara and the subsequent trilogy. It immediately follows the novel Armageddon's Children. It details events during the Great Wars, a historical conflict referenced frequently in the Shannara books. The conclusion to the trilogy and the sequel to The Elves of Cintra is The Gypsy Morph, which was released in August 2008.

== Plot summary ==
=== Logan Tom and the Ghosts ===
Beginning where Armageddon's Children ended, Knight of the Word Logan Tom races to save the gypsy morph Hawk and his girlfriend Tessa from being thrown to their deaths from atop Safeco Field. He is too late but learns that a brilliant white light enveloped the two as they fell, apparently saved by an unknown magic. Logan doesn't know where they have gone, but sees a demon invasion force preparing to land at Seattle's waterfront. Meanwhile, the Ghosts head toward the agreed upon rendezvous point and Logan Tom goes to find them.

While evacuating the city, Panther and Sparrow are separated from the Ghost tribe. The Ghosts encounter a group of mutant children on the freeway, and escape them but not before Squirrel is killed. Logan runs into Panther and Sparrow, helping them fight off Croaks and reunite with the tribe. They leave the city in Logan's all-terrain vehicle as they see the demon hordes besiege Safeco Field. Owl realizes their dog Cheney has gone missing.

The Lady of the Word appears to Logan and tells him to head south to the Columbia River where Hawk will meet them with many followers. He is also told that another Knight of the Word will bring the Elves and their magic, upon which humankind's future depends. She tasks him with protecting them all, no matter the cost. As he and the Ghosts travel south, the Weatherman succumbs to plague, and they pick up two new companions, a partially mutated Lizard named Cat (for Catayla) and her pet cat named Rabbit. They also have a run-in with killer robots at Oronyx Experimental Robotics Systems. Later they are ambushed by followers of Krilka Koos, a rogue Knight of the Word that Logan had once heard about (from the Spiders in the mountains when trying to reach Seattle in Armageddon's Children) near Longview. In exchange for the children's safety, Logan agrees to go with them to meet Krilka. Krilka, having fallen from the Word, asks Logan to join his own crusade. Logan refuses and is forced to fight the Knight of the Word surrounded by Krilka's army. Logan Tom narrowly wins, but refuses to kill Krilka, who vows to hunt down and kill Logan and the Ghosts. He then plunges a poison dart into Logan's leg. Delirious, Logan shoots fire from his staff at the crowd, causing them to panic and flee. The ghosts manage to extricate Logan and escape in the ATV.

=== Angel Perez and the Elves ===
In the Elven city of Arborlon, Kirisin and Erisha are caught in the library by Culph, the King's historian. Culph offers to help them find the seeking Elfstones, revealing that they were buried with the powerful Elven Queen Pancea Rolt Cruer. However, they are unable to find her grave. The Knight of the Word Angel Perez and the tatterdemalion Ailie arrive in the Cintra shortly afterward, escorted by a group of Elven Trackers, including Kirisin's sister Simralin. Angel and Ailie are given an audience with the High Council and the King, while Culph lead Kirisin and Erisha to a vantage point where they can eavesdrop on the meeting. Angel and Ailie tell the Council that they have been sent by the Word to help them take the elves and the Ellcrys to a safe place. Angel has been tasked with helping the Elves to find the Loden Elfstone, and is dismayed to learn that the Elves retain almost no knowledge of the Elfstones.

The Council is astounded. The King confirms that Kirisin told him of a warning from the Ellcrys, but didn't inform the Council. The King remains skeptical and orders a more extensive search of the histories and they will reconvene in two days. Kirisin, Erisha, Simralin, Angel, and Ailie meet later that night to share information on the Elfstones and theorize as to why the King seems unwilling to help them. Ailie makes a startling revelation, that she sensed a demon at the Council meeting. At the same time, the demon Delloreen (who has now mutated to have an animal-like, scaly form, with virtually no vestiges of any human-like qualities), who had been tracking Angel, enters the Cintra. To her surprise, she finds a fellow demon disguised as an elf. The two become allies with the disguised demon taking command.

The following evening, Kirisin, Erisha, Simralin, Angel, and Ailie follow clues to another part of the graveyard and find the Elf Queen's grave. They encounter the shade of the Queen, who nearly kills the party in anger for allowing Elven magic to fade. Instead she forces Kirisin to promise to persuade the Elves to rediscover their magic and to begin using it again. She says that Kirisin has magic that he is currently unaware of and that what he must do, he must do alone. She gives Kirisin the Elfstones and disappears.

Delloreen attacks the party in the graveyard, killing Ailie and Erisha. Simralin stabs the beast in the eye with an Elven blade and Delloreen flees. They find they are pursued by the Elven guard and flee the city to seek the Loden. Once clear of the city, Kirisin uses the Elfstones, which direct them to Syrring Rise (current day Mount Rainier). They head north, still pursued by the two demons. At the Columbia River they find a blind elven ex-tracker named Larkis Quill, who ferries them across as the bridges are all occupied by militias. The three leave Larkis and travel by a secret elven hot air balloon to Syrring Rise. While ascending the snowy peak, Angel senses Delloreen's presence and stays behind. She confronts the demon and blinds it by clawing out its remaining eye. Delloreen is finally killed, but not before savagely injuring Angel. She later awakens from unconsciousness fearing internal injuries, but resumes her climb up the mountain's face.

Within the ice caves on the mountain's peak, Kirisin and Simralin find a frozen, life-size statue of a dragon. Deep within the statue's cavernous throat, Kirisin finds the Loden. As he exits the dragon's mouth, however, he and Simralin are assaulted by Culph, who reveals himself as the demon. Simralin is seriously wounded by Culph, and is lying on the floor nearly unconscious. Culph explains that he had been lying to the king but still aiding in the search for the Loden, because the demons believe they can eliminate the elven threat to them by imprisoning them in the Loden. Needing an elf to wield the Loden, Culph tries to cast a mind-controlling spell on Kirisin. However, he lets slip that seeking Elfstones can also be used as weapons in time of great need. Although greatly weakened, Simralin is able to stab Culph in the leg, distracting him. This frees Kirisin from the spell that Culph was just about to complete. Kirisin is then able to direct the seeking Elfstones towards Culph, disintegrating him in blue fire.

=== Hawk, Tessa, and Cheney ===
After disappearing from Safeco Field, Hawk was transported to a strange garden where he meets a mystical old man called the King of the Silver River, who tells him Tessa is safe and sleeping. As they walk through the garden, the old man tells of Hawk's origins and reveals that it was his magic that saved Hawk at the Safeco Field. Finally, the old man tells Hawk that his purpose is to save the human race and that he will lead several thousand Humans, Elves, and others to a Promised Land. As Hawk falls asleep next to Tessa, the old man reveals that Hawk will awaken in his own world with Tessa and Cheney, and that several weeks will have passed.

Hawk, Tessa, and Cheney awake to find themselves near the Columbia River. They head upstream and encounter the survivors of the Anaheim Complex that Angel had previously rescued. The survivors are now led by a woman named Helen Rice, who is skeptical that Hawk was sent to guide them to safety. As the group approaches a bridge controlled by militia, Hawk discovers some of his innate magic. He touches some nearby flora, and within minutes, vines and plant life erupt from the ground and subdue the militia. The survivors cross the bridge when Hawk learns that an army led by Findo Gask is approaching from the south. Unknown to Hawk, Findo has sensed the gypsy morph (Hawk) once again and entreats a monstrous demon called "the Klee" to find and destroy it. Despite the approaching danger, Hawk leaves the party with Tessa and Cheney to search for the Ghost tribe, instructing Helen to take in any other refugees she finds. Finally, they find the Ghosts and Logan Tom, who has been in a coma for two days.

== Characters in "The Elves of Cintra" ==
The book tends to follow three separate storylines: Logan Tom's travel south, Angel Perez's travel north, and Hawk's storyline. The characters are organized by which storyline they belong to in this novel, as follows:

Logan Tom's storyline

- Logan Tom, Knight of the Word
- Owl (Margaret), a member of the Ghosts, a wheelchair user
- Candle (Sarah), a member of the Ghosts, can sense when danger approaches
- Panther, a member of the Ghosts
- Bear, a member of the Ghosts
- River, a member of the Ghosts
- Fixit, a member of the Ghosts, good at fixing things
- Chalk, a member of the Ghosts, good at drawing
- Sparrow, a member of the Ghosts
- Squirrel, a member of the Ghosts
- The Weatherman, River's mad, homeless grandfather
- Catalya/Cat, a Lizard, helps Logan acquire plague medicines in Tacoma in return for taking her with them
- Rabbit, Catalya's cat, hops around like a rabbit
- Krilka Koos, rogue Knight of the Word
- The Senator, the mutant leader of those not living in the compounds in Tacoma
- The Lady, voice of the Word
- Meike, girl living in the Seattle compound
- John Ross, Knight of the Word

Angel Perez's storyline

- Angel Perez, Knight of the Word
- Ailie, a tatterdemalion sent by the Word, average lifespan of tatterdemalions is 30 days
- Kirisin Belloruus, an Elf, a member of the Chosen, nephew of the King
- Simralin Belloruus, an Elf, Kirisin's older sister, Elven Tracker
- Erisha Belloruus, the Elven King's daughter and another Chosen
- Culph, the Elven King's historian, a demon in disguise
- Delloreen, a demon hunting Angel Perez
- Larkin Quill, a now-blind Elf, former Elven Tracker
- Tragen, an Elven Tracker, romantically involved with Simralin
- Arissen Belloruus, King of the Elves
- Basselin, Prime Minister of the Elven High Council
- Ordanna Frae, member of the High Council
- Biat, another Chosen
- Ruslan, an Elf under Simralin's command
- Que'rue, an Elf under Simralin's command
- Praxia, a female Elf under Simralin's command
- Pancea Rolt Cruer, an Elf queen buried with the Elf stones

Hawk's storyline

- Hawk, leader of the Ghosts tribe and a gypsy morph
- Tessa, former member of Safeco Field compound and Hawk's girlfriend
- Cheney, Hawk's dog
- King of the Silver River, responsible for Hawk's appearances and disappearances in the outside world
- Helen Rice, leader of the survivors of the Anaheim compound
- Nest Freemark, a deceased warrior for the Word, and Hawk's mother
- Findo Gask, the demon commander of a Void army
- The Klee, a demon under Findo Gask
