= El Husseini (crater) =

Crater on Mercury

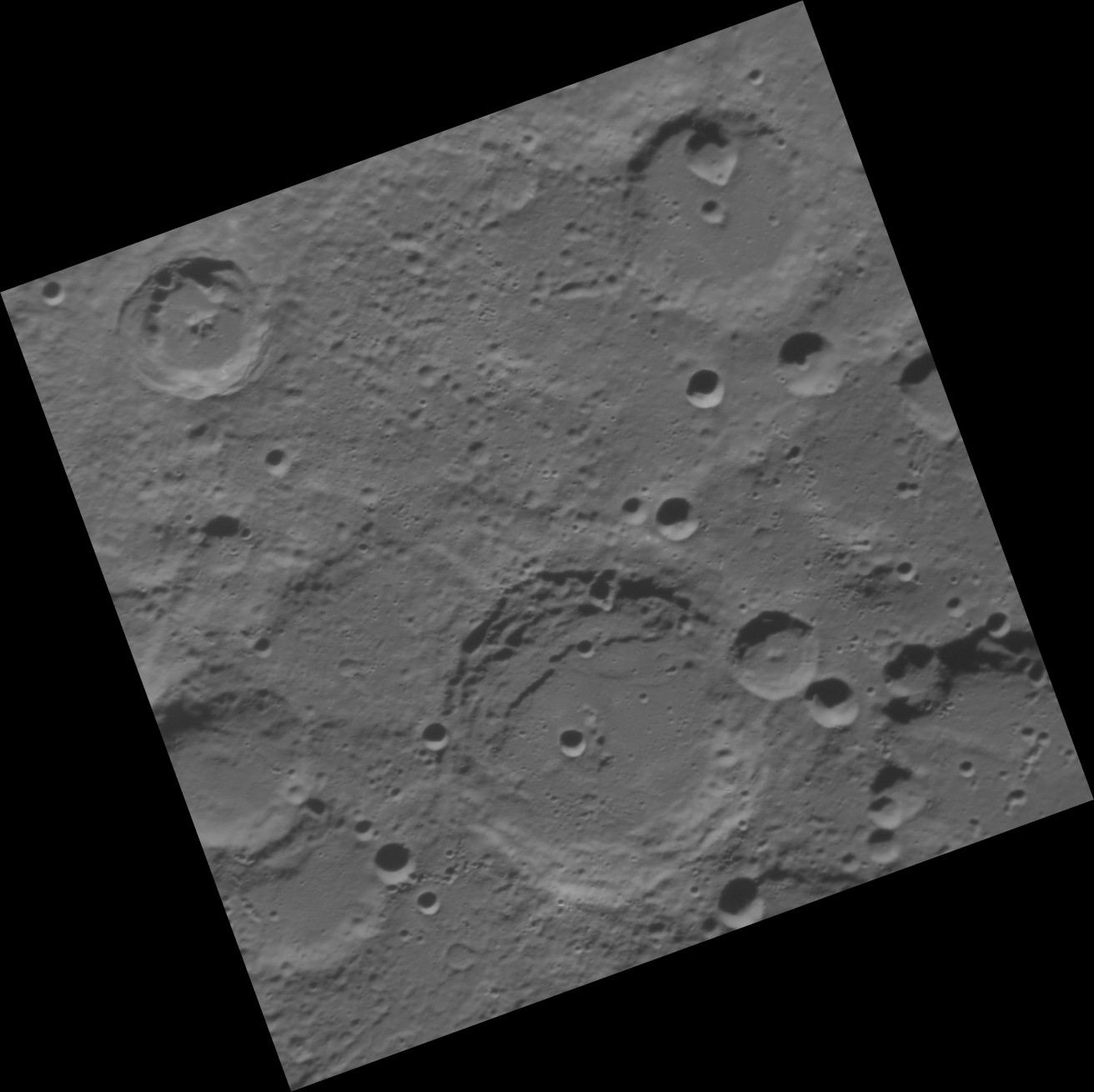
- MESSENGER NAC
- Planet: Mercury
- Coordinates: 75.34°S 333.34°W
- Quadrangle: Bach
- Diameter: 87.0 km (54.1 mi)
- Eponym: Jumana El Husseini

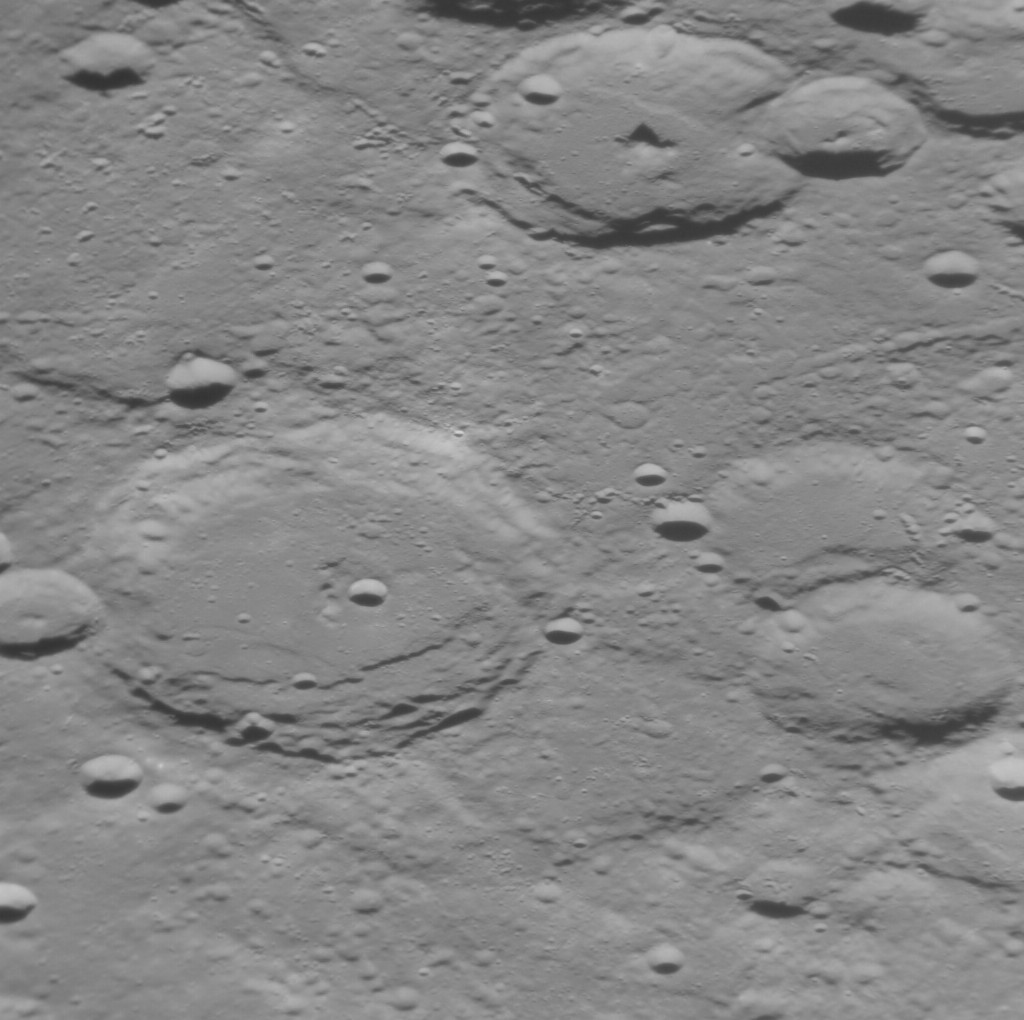
Oblique view

El Husseini is a crater on Mercury. Its name was adopted by the International Astronomical Union (IAU) on November 14, 2024. The crater is named for Palestinian painter and sculptor Jumana El Husseini.

El Husseini is southeast of Wu Shujuan crater.
