= MacNicol (crater) =

Crater on Mercury

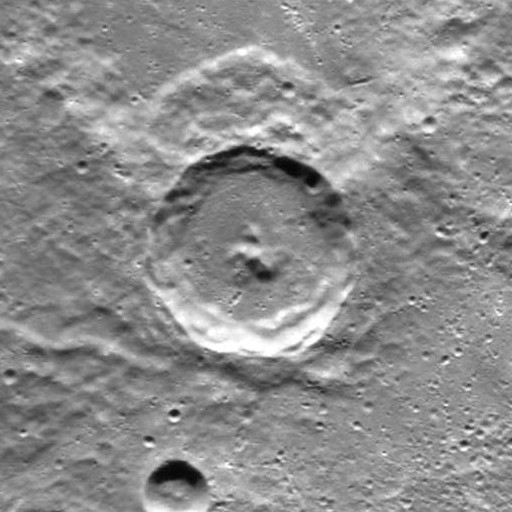
- MESSENGER NAC
- Planet: Mercury
- Coordinates: 68.19°S 355.95°W
- Quadrangle: Bach
- Diameter: 42.0 km (26.1 mi)
- Eponym: Bessie MacNicol

MacNicol is a crater on Mercury. Its name was adopted by the International Astronomical Union in 2022. MacNicol is named for the Scottish painter Bessie MacNicol, who lived from 1869 to 1904.

To the southeast of MacNicol is the crater Nairne.
