= Laurence Oliphant (Jacobite) =

Scottish landowner and Jacobite soldier (1691–1767)

Laurence Oliphant 6th Laird of Gask
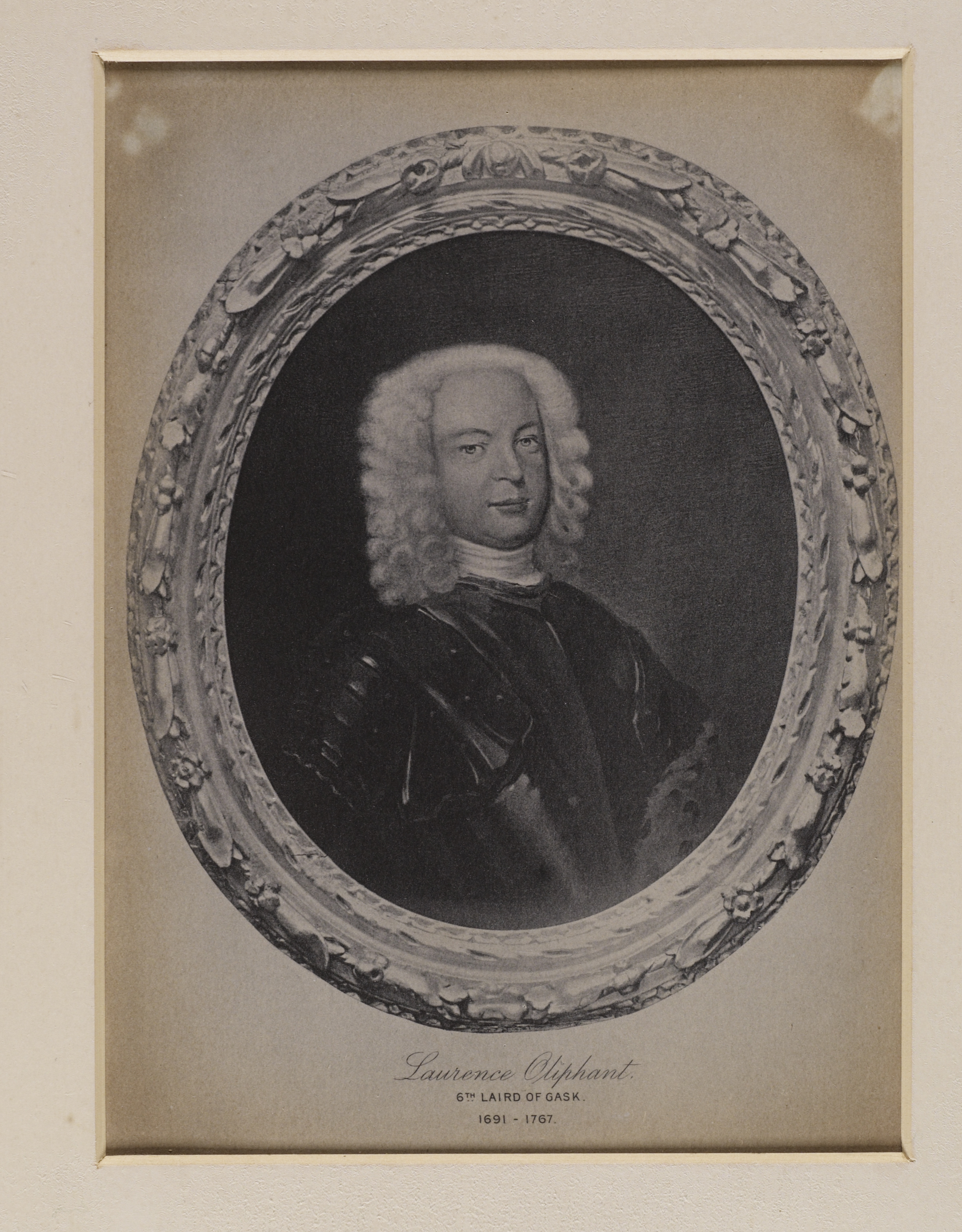
- Portrait of Laurence Oliphant dressed in armour
- Born: 1691; Findo Gask, Perthshire, Scotland
- Died: 1767 (aged 75–76); Findo Gask, Perthshire, Scotland
- Spouse: Amelia Murray (m. 1723)

Laurence Oliphant (1691–1767) was a Scottish landowner and Jacobite army officer. He participated in two Jacobite uprisings, but later made his peace with the British government.

== Biography ==
Oliphant was the son of James Oliphant and Janet (née Murray). He belonged to a branch of Clan Oliphant settled at Findo Gask in Perthshire, Scotland. Oliphant was sent by his father to join the Earl of Mar in the Jacobite rising of 1715, and he was present among Jacobite forces at the Battle of Sheriffmuir. He was subsequently an adjutant to the garrison of Scone Palace during the brief stay of James Francis Edward Stuart, the Old Pretender, in January 1716.

In 1732, he succeeded his father as Laird of Gask. During the Jacobite rising of 1745, Oliphant rallied to the Jacobite cause a second time and joined Charles Edward Stuart at Blair Castle in early September 1745. His tenants, however, refused to take up arms alongside their laird. Oliphant served as Governor of Perth during the Jacobite advance to Derby and he and his son were present at the battles of Falkirk and Culloden in 1746.

Oliphant and his son were among the Jacobites who regrouped at Ruthven Barracks after the defeat at Culloden. After the remnant of the Jacobite army dispersed, they went into hiding in the Angus Glens for seven months before taking ship from Arbroath for Amsterdam on 5 November 1746, and from there to Sweden. From there they travelled to France where they lived mostly at Corbeil, near Versailles. He and his son were attainted under the Attainder of Earl of Kellie and Others Act 1745 (19 Geo. 2. c. 26), but in 1753 Oliphant's friends purchased the Gask estate from the government and presented it back to him.

In May 1751, he petitioned the Old Pretender to be formally recognised as Lord Oliphant in the Peerage of Scotland. On 14 July 1760 Oliphant was created Lord Oliphant in the Jacobite peerage by the Old Pretender. Having obtained permission from the British government, Oliphant returned to Scotland in 1763 and spent the last years of his life quietly on his Gask estate. He died in 1767.

=== Family and descendants ===
In 1723 Oliphant married Amelia Murray (1698–1774), a daughter of William Murray, second Lord Nairne. Oliphant was succeeded as laird and in his Jacobite title by his eldest son, Laurence, who remained loyal to the House of Stuart until his death in 1792. His descendants include Carolina, Baroness Nairne and from his sister Lilias, who married Laurence Oliphant (5th) of Condie, are descended Laurence Oliphant the author, MP and diplomat and Thomas Oliphant, musician and author of "Deck the Halls with Boughs of Holly".

Peerage of Scotland
New creation	— TITULAR — Lord Oliphant; Jacobite peerage 1760–1767	Succeeded by Laurence Oliphant
