= Bearers of the Black Staff =

2010 novel by Terry Brooks

- First edition (publ. Del Ray Books)
- Author: Terry Brooks
- Genre: Fantasy
- Publisher: Del Rey Books
- Publication date: August 24, 2010
- ISBN: 978-0-345-48417-8
- Followed by: The Measure of the Magic (2011)

Bearers of the Black Staff is a fantasy novel by American writer Terry Brooks, released on August 24, 2010, as the first of a two-part series called the Legends of Shannara. In the series' timeline, it falls between the Genesis of Shannara trilogy and the First King of Shannara. It takes place 500 years after the events of the final Genesis book, The Gypsy Morph. The people who were saved by Hawk's magic are able to head out into the World once again, since the effects of nuclear holocaust have dissipated.

The sequel to this novel is the 2011 novel, The Measure of the Magic.

== Synopsis ==
As described by Cristina Donati of FantasyMagazine (translated),

The story begins about 500 years after the events of The Gypsy Morph. The heirs of the survivors of the war with the Demons and the magical boy named Hawk are facing a terrible challenge: the enchanted seals that have defended the valley from the horrors of a global catastrophe have been disrupted. Humans, elves, and mutants are therefore devoid of that protective shell that seemed like it would last forever.

One day, Sider Ament - a direct descendant of the Knights of the Word - finds unknown predators in their own little paradise, and fears the worst. He finds two men who are brutally murdered. Sider Ament warns the other inhabitants of the valley of the danger and the need to develop appropriate plans. This, however, will not be easy, since just across the border an army of trolls is massing for an invasion.

The descendants of the survivors of the Great War face incredible challenges in this new novel, set in the pre-history of Shannara.

== Reception ==
Bearers of the Black Staff received reviews from Booklist, Kirkus Reviews, and Publishers Weekly.

It was nominated for the 2010 Goodreads Choice Award for Fantasy.
