= Robert Gardiner (cricketer) =

Scottish cricketer

Personal information
- Full name: Robert Gardiner
- Born: 18 May 1878; Findo Gask, Perthshire, Scotland
- Died: 24 February 1959 (aged 80); Perth, Perthshire, Scotland
- Batting: Right-handed
- Role: Wicket-keeper

Domestic team information
- Years: Team
- 1909–1914: Scotland

Career statistics
Competition	First-class
Matches	3
Runs scored	133
Batting average	26.60
100s/50s	–/1
Top score	72
Catches/stumpings	–/–
- Source: Cricinfo, 26 July 2022

Robert Gardiner (18 May 1878 – 24 February 1959) was a Scottish first-class cricketer.

The son of Robert Gardiner senior, a farmer, he was born in May 1878 at Findo Gask, Perthshire. A club cricketer for Perthshire Cricket Club, he made his debut as a wicket-keeper for Scotland against Ireland at Perth in 1909. He made two further first-class appearances for Scotland, both against Ireland in 1913 and 1914. In his three first-class appearances, Gardiner scored 133 runs at an average of 26.60; he made one half century, a score of 72 in the 1913 fixture. He inherited Henhill Farm at Forteviot following the death of his father in 1909. Following the end of the First World War, Gardiner organised the Perth Farmer's Peace Show. Outside of cricket, Gardiner was a curler and was a member of the Forteviot Curling Club and helped organise the visit to Perthshire by a touring Canadian curling team in 1925. Gardiner died at Perth in February 1959.
