= Angel Fire East =

1999 novel by Terry Brooks

- First edition cover
- Author: Terry Brooks
- Cover artist: Gerald Brom
- Language: English
- Series: Word & Void series
- Genre: Fantasy
- Publisher: Del Rey Books
- Publication date: October 26, 1999
- Publication place: United States
- Media type: Print (hardback & paperback)
- Pages: 352
- ISBN: 0-345-37964-0
- OCLC: 41086723
- Dewey Decimal: 813/.54 21
- LC Class: PS3552.R6596 A8 1999
- Preceded by: A Knight of the Word
- Followed by: Armageddon's Children

Angel Fire East is a fantasy novel by American writer Terry Brooks, the third and final novel in the Word & Void series, a prequel to his Shannara series. It was first published in 1999 by Ballantine's Del Rey division. The novel takes place around Christmas in 2012, ten years after the events of A Knight of the Word. The story returns to the town of Hopewell, Illinois as Nest Freemark and John Ross attempt to unlock a potentially world-altering magic.

== Plot summary ==
John Ross has a vision of the future where a crucified Knight of the Word (one that resembles himself) tells him that a "Gypsy morph" is about to be created in the present. The creation of a Gypsy morph is a rare event - it is a convergence of magic that can become a powerful tool for either the Void or the Word depending on who unlocks its secret. The morph, however, will dissipate within a month if the secret remains hidden and the magic will be lost. John manages to catch the morph in the Pacific Northwest and escape his demon pursuers. The morph changes from creature to creature before settling on the appearance of a four-year-old boy. The only word the boy says is "Nest", prompting John to head back to Hopewell, Illinois to find out if Nest Freemark, whom he has not seen in ten years, can help him. However a resourceful demon named Findo Gask has been tracking John. He has recruited three other demons - Penny Dreadful (a young goth-type girl with crazy red hair and a penchant for self-destruction), Twitch (a half-crazed hulking albino man), and an ur'droch (a lethal demon who remains in its dark, shadowy form instead of taking on a human guise). Findo has heard the Gypsy morph's words in the ether and knows where to go to intercept John Ross. He and the three other demons arrive in town before him.

Nest, now a 29-year-old divorcee, had won several Olympic track gold medals, but had to retire from running because she nearly turned into the ghost-wolf Wraith during an event. She still lives in her house near the park and tends to the area with the sylvan, Pick. Four days before Christmas, she is visited by Findo Gask and immediately recognizes him as a demon. He threatens her but does not harm her. She also meets Penny at church, but does not realize she is a demon. Later that day, Bennett Scott, whom Nest saved from falling off a cliff when Bennett was a preschooler fifteen years earlier, appears on her doorstep. Bennett is now a single mother of a young girl, Harper, and trying to get clean from a drug addiction. Nest naturally invites her to stay with her. That night, while Christmas caroling, Nest and her church group are attacked by Twitch. Nest nearly has to call on Wraith when Penny appears, calls him off and pretends that he is a mentally disabled relative, and no one is seriously hurt. Later that night, John Ross arrives with the Gypsy morph boy, whom they decide to call "Little John".

The next morning Nest and John fill each other in on recent events. Bennett and Harper go for a walk in the park where they meet Penny. Penny offers Bennett drugs, but before she can accept, O'olish Amaneh appears and takes them home. Nest then goes for a walk in the park with O'olish, whom she also has not seen in ten years, who suggests that if Nest spends some time attempting to communicate with Little John instead of waiting for him to open up to her it may help unlock his secrets. He also tells her that soon he may never see her again as he plans to return to his ancestors. He then mysteriously disappears, as usual. Nest takes his advice and tries to talk to Little John, but no progress is made. Later that day the group does some tobogganing and narrowly avoids an assassination attempt by Findo Gask, thanks to Pick's last-minute warning. Instead, Findo Gask kills the park worker Ray Childress that night with the trap he intended for Nest and her guests.

The next evening O'olish Amaneh again appears to Nest, and encourages her to persevere with Little John. After he leaves her, he is pursued by Findo Gask and his demon minions. Surrounded, he disappears in a whirlwind of snow. That night, Nest, Bennett, and the kids go to a neighborhood Christmas party while John spends some time with his old flame, Josie Jackson. Bennett abandons her child at the party, leaving Nest a note explaining how she intends to leave for a while. She meets up with Penny who gives her drugs, then Penny and Findo Gask trick her into falling off the cliff in the park that nearly claimed her fifteen years ago. Nest returns home with Harper and Little John and is attacked by the ur'droch. Wraith comes forth from her to successfully repel him. Before Wraith reenters Nest, Little John calls her "Mama" and runs into her arms, but refuses to do so after Wraith returns to Nest, foreshadowing what is to come.

The next day, Christmas Eve, Bennett's body is found and Nest has to tell Harper that her mother has died, and that now she will be Harper's family. That evening, however, Harper and Little John are kidnapped by Findo Gask. Nest knows from previous interactions with Findo Gask that he doesn't know that Little John is the Gypsy morph. She also realizes that Penny is in league with Findo Gask and they are likely hiding out at the house where she was attacked by Twitch. She and John head over to the house for a preemptive strike, but before doing so, Nest knows she needs to check to see if the demons have booby-trapped or otherwise warded the house with invisible magic. She needs Pick to find this out for her, so she sends out Wraith to find Pick in the park. Wraith bounds forth and runs from within her, this time severing their magical tie. Nest realizes neither one of them was happy with Wraith being trapped within her, and knows it is for the best that he remain separate but near to her, still remaining her protector. Nest, Wraith and John Ross are successful in destroying Findo Gask's three demonic henchmen (Penny, Twitch, and the ur'droch) and rescuing the children, but John is mortally poisoned. Finally, when Little John sees that Wraith has left Nest permanently, the Gypsy morph is able to become what it was meant to be: an unborn child of destiny within Nest's womb.

Findo Gask, thinking that the Gypsy morph's time ran out and its magic had dissipated, leaves town. Nest, perceiving her magical conception, decides to name the child John Ross Freemark, and heads back for home to start a new life with Harper and her future child. John Ross, weak and poisoned, lays down by the river in the park. As he passes into death, he sees the Lady, the voice of the Word, reaching out to him and calling him home. As John takes her hand his body disappears and his staff falls to the ground. O'olish Amaneh appears from the shadows, picks up the staff and surveys the horizon in contemplation of the continuous struggle between the Word and the Void.

== Characters in "Angel Fire East" ==
The characters in the book are as follows:

- Freemark, Nest
- Ross, John
- O'olish Amaneh
- Gask, Findo
- Dreadful, Penny
- Twitch
- Ur'droch
- Wraith
- Little John
- Scott, Bennett
- Scott, Harper
- Pick
- Jonathan
- Jackson, Josie
- Heppler, Robert
- The Lady
- Glyndwyr, Owain
