= Robert Waterman Gardner =

American architect

Robert Waterman Gardner (1866 - September 7, 1937) was an architect who pioneered using reinforced concrete in residential architecture. He was president of the New York Society of Craftsmen.

== Biography ==
He was born in 1866 in Jackson, Mississippi to Hezekiah Ripley Gardner and Eliza Wheeler. He studied architecture with Calvert Vaux and Clarence Luce from 1887 to 1891. He married Eleanor O'Neill of Elmira, New York in 1893.

He worked on his own starting in 1905. His first wife died in 1925 and he married Elizabeth Randolph Rice of Philadelphia in 1926.

He died on September 7, 1937 Southampton Hospital in Southampton, New York.

== Projects ==
- Wartburg Lutheran Home (1934).
- Saint Mark's Church (Westhampton Beach, New York) in Westhampton Beach, New York (1937).
