= Bob Gardiner =

Bob Gardiner may refer to:

- Bob Gardiner (animator) (1951–2005), animator who helped pioneer what would become known as Claymation
- Bob Gardiner (racewalker) (born 1936), Australian former racewalker
