= Armageddon's Children =

2006 novel by Terry Brooks

- Cover art of Armageddon's Children
- Author: Terry Brooks
- Language: English
- Series: The Great Wars
- Genre: Fantasy
- Publisher: Del Rey Books
- Publication date: 29 August 2006
- Publication place: United States
- Media type: Print (hardback & paperback)
- Pages: 384
- ISBN: 0-345-48408-8
- OCLC: 63705877
- Dewey Decimal: 813/.54 22
- LC Class: PS3552.R6596 A83 2006
- Preceded by: Angel Fire East
- Followed by: The Elves of Cintra

Armageddon's Children is a fantasy novel by American writer Terry Brooks, the first in his trilogy The Genesis of Shannara, which bridges the events of Brooks' Word and Void trilogy with his Shannara series. It takes place in an apocalyptic world around the year 2100 (about eighty years after the novel Angel Fire East) and details the events during the Great Wars, a historical conflict referenced frequently in the Shannara books. It is followed by the novel The Elves of Cintra.

== Plot summary ==
The world, now ravaged by nuclear war and plague, lies in ruins, overrun by Demons and other monsters, with the remaining humans forced into tightly controlled fortress-like compounds. A group of children, the Ghosts, hide out in the ruins of downtown Seattle. Their leader, Hawk, is multi-talented, and unaware that he is a gypsy morph, a magical creature. He has prophetic dreams in which he leads a large group into a new "promised land". He secretly sees Tessa, a girl from the nearby compound at Safeco Field, though they are forbidden to be together by compound law.

A young Ghost girl named River, sneaks out of the hideout. Hawk tracks her, and finds that she has been secretly visiting a man that turns out to be her grandfather—a mad homeless man whom everyone else knows as the Weatherman (because of his incoherent meteorological ramblings). He is sick with a plague and Hawk grudgingly agrees to take him back to the hideout to have him cared for. Later, Hawk goes to bring medical supplies as part of a trade to one of the competing tribes, the Cats, but while he is away the rest of the gang is attacked by a mutant resembling a giant centipede. The beast is destroyed by Sparrow and Cheney, but Cheney is mortally wounded. Hawk, arriving just after the battle, cradles Cheney and mysteriously the dog's life is restored. Confused, Hawk sets out to visit Tessa, but is captured by guards at the Safeco compound. He and Tessa are sentenced to death for breaking the law of the compound.

Meanwhile, deep in the Oregon woods in the Elven kingdom known as The Cintra, exists Arborlon, the largest Elven city in the world, hidden away from men. Long ago in "the time of Faerie", Elves had conquered the demon hordes that ruled the planet, sealing the forces into another world called the "Forbidding". The linchpin of the barrier that keeps the demons in the Forbidding is the Ellcrys, a sentient tree that resides in the Cintra. The Ellcrys is protected by the Chosen, teenaged guards specially selected by the tree herself. The Ellcrys telepathically tells two of these guardians (Kirisin and his cousin Erisha, the Elven King's daughter) that a force is coming that will forever change the world. The Ellcrys tells them that they must find the three seeking Elfstones and use them to locate the Loden Elfstone— in which the tree can be sealed for protection and transport. The King behaves suspiciously when they tell him of the Ellcrys' message, and refuses to act. Erisha and Kirisin then try to sneak into the library to find out more information about the Elfstones, but are caught.

Elsewhere, there are two remaining Knights of the Word. Angel Perez, who is pursued by the demon Findo Gask and his henchwoman Delloreen. After narrowly escaping death in an encounter with Delloreen after rescuing a group of children, Angel is confronted by a Tatterdemalion, a messenger of the Word, named Ailie. Angel is told of the existence of Elves, and instructed to head north and seek the Loden Elfstone.

The other Knight is Logan Tom, who is charged by the Native American O'olish Amaneh, also a servant of the Word, to find the gypsy morph and give him the bones of Nest Freemark's right hand, and shows Logan how, by casting the bones, they will point in the direction of the gypsy morph. Using Nest's bones as a guide, Logan eventually reaches the Ghost hideout in Seattle. He tells the Ghosts his story, and they come to realize that the gypsy morph must be Hawk, who had just left to meet Tessa. Far to the south, Findo Gask has felt the magic emanating from Hawk when the dog Cheney was healed and identified it as the gypsy morph's as well. Logan is able to gain entrance into the Safeco compound and give Hawk the bones of Nest Freemark. Although Hawk does not instantly realize who he is, he soon recalls his mother, her life and death. But he still doesn't know what he is supposed to do to fulfill his vision.

Unfortunately, Logan is unable to save Hawk from his sentencing—Hawk and Tessa are thrown from the top of the compound. Elsewhere in the city, Owl and the Ghosts are preparing to abandon Seattle, Sparrow sees what she believes is a demon invasion army coming in from the ocean.
