= The Last Druid =

2020 novel by Terry Brooks

- Cover art of The Last Druid
- Author: Terry Brooks
- Cover artist: Mike Bryan based on a photograph by Michael Frost
- Language: English
- Series: The Fall of Shannara
- Genre: Fantasy
- Publisher: Del Rey Books
- Publication date: October 20, 2020
- Publication place: United States
- Media type: Mass Market Paperback
- Pages: 592 pp
- ISBN: 978-0356510286
- Preceded by: The Stiehl Assassin

The Last Druid is a fantasy novel by Terry Brooks in his Shannara series. It is the New York Times Bestselling "fourth book in the Fall of Shannara series," first published in 2020, and the final book overall in his Shannara series that first began in 1977.

== Plot ==
The novel picks up where The Stiehl Assassin left off. Tarsha Kaynin survived her fall from the cliffs at the Cleeg Hold and she returns to Emberen to discover what happened to Drisker Arc and how to rescue him. She returns with the help of kind stranger, where she buries her brother, and reconnects with Fade. At Flinc's underground lair, she discovers that Flinc is still alive. He brings her Drisker's books of magic, but they find nothing of use, until Tarsha stumbles upon a symbol that matches something she had seen on a wall at Paranor, so she decides to return to Paranor.

Meanwhile, Drisker finds himself trapped in the Forbidding, and begins searching for Grianne. Her Ulk Bog companion Weka Dart finds him first. Grianne had sent him to find Drisker, but Weka immediately voices his fear that Drisker has come to take his mistress away. Despite this, he leads Drisker on the three-day journey to meet her. Along the way, Drisker takes ill from something he ate, and Weka leaves him to get Grianne.

Drisker puts up a magic shield to protect himself, then slips into a fever dream where he is able to communicate with Tarsha. They are unable to speak, but he is able to communicate to her that he is trapped in the Forbidding, and she communicates that Flinc is alive. Tarsha finds that she is able to pass the Guardian and enter Paranor as Allanon anointed her a Druid at the Hadeshorn. Once inside, she has a second dream with Drisker. Drisker communicates the location of a secret room containing the Druid Histories she is seeking. She discovers two volumes written by Grianne and uses her Wishsong to reveal text on two blank pages that Grianne had hidden with magic that could only be undone by one of Grianne's bloodline. On the pages she discovers that the darkwand that freed Grianne from the Forbidding is still inside the Forbidding. She then heads to the Federation encampment where she confers with Belladrin Rish.

Later, Drisker is rescued by Grianne, and she takes him to her home at Kraal Reach, where she heals him. She reveals that she has had a vision that Drisker is the key to her escape from the Forbidding. He reveals to her that the darkwand is in the Forbidding. Grianne tells him that she looked for it, but never found it. Weka Dart reveals that the demon Vendra Trax, king of the Chule, has it at his lair, the Iron Crèche. Weka Dart continues to voice his displeasure that Grianne is trying to leave the Forbidding, but eventually they make the dangerous journey to the Iron Crèche, along with three demon guards. After six days traveling through dangerous swampland, they enter the Iron Crèche through secret tunnels. Spirit wall dwellers lead them through the walls to Vendra Trax's apartment where they search unsuccessfully for the darkwand, inadvertently triggering a trap that alerts Trax of their presence. He had been expecting them because one of Grianne's demon guards had informed him of the plan. The demons are all killed, including the informant. Grianne kills Vendra Trax in a confrontation. Weka reveals to Drisker that he knew all along that the darkwand wasn't in the Iron Crèche, but that he knows where it is. Grianne, Drisker and Weka escape back through the tunnels empty handed. Grianne then conjures a dragon to fly them back to Kraal Reach. When they return, Grianne learns of Weka's treachery and furiously demands he bring her the darkwand, which he reluctantly does. Grianne and Drisker then use the darkwand to depart the Forbidding, but in a rage, Weka stabs Drisker before the spell completes. Drisker and Grianne arrive in the Four Lands, but Drisker dies from his wounds.

After the assassination of the Federation Prime Minister, his assistant, the Skaar Penetrator Belladrin Rish is chosen to serve in his place while a new Prime Minister is chosen. She will move forward in negotiating the peace she alleges Ketter Vause intended to make with the Skaar, allowing them to keep the lands they have occupied. She meets with the Skaar king, her true sovereign, where it is revealed that he intends to break the truce and kill them all.

Meanwhile, the crew of the Behemoth have been searching for Dar and Ajin. Shea decides to go off on his own, Seelah tags along, and with the help of Borshawk, they fly on giant hawk-like bird called a shrike to find their missing friends. Dar and Ajin crash landed and ended up being captured by cannibals called the Jutes, but they manage to escape when the Jutes are spooked by a shrieking sound. They are almost recaptured, but Borshawks shrike tears apart their attackers, and they fly them back to the Behemoth. The Behemoth then sets sail for Skaarsland, finally arriving in the winter wasteland. Ajin heads into the city alone to find it in a desperate state full of beggars. Her mother's caretaker tells her that her mother was taken captive. While she sleeps, Ajin is taken captive by wolf-men and thrown into a cell in the palace dungeon with her mother. The wolf-men are the creation of the Pretender. Using dark magic and science, she turned men into wolf-creatures, stripped of their memories, and identities, they have become her slaves. She threatens that she will slip a potion into their food and drink that will turn them into wolf creatures as well, so Ajin and her mother stop eating and drinking.

Clizia Porse holes up in a cottage with the murderous Jachyra she released from the Forbidding. She goes to the Federation encampment to deal with Ketter Vause only to find he is dead. She makes a deal with Belladrin Rish to send her Jachyra to kill Col d'Amphere, if she will support her as she establishes a new druid order at Paranor. Belladrin agrees and also tells her where Tarsha is in the camp so Clizia can kill her. Belladrin hopes that with the Skaar king dead, she can keep the truce, and remain in her position in the Federation as she has begun to cherish the Four Lands and does not want to leave. With him dead no one would know she is actually a spy. Clizia then attempts to kill Tarsha, but fails, and is left weakened from the confrontation. Commander Choten Benz then reveals to the dwarves Battenhyle and Lakodan that he suspects Belladrin is a spy. He confronts her with his suspicions, and she kills him, aware that the dwarves may be on to her too. She hides his body in a chest, and has it disposed of by a soldier who is unaware of the contents. Later, the dwarves confront her with their suspicions. They reveal that they found Benz's body and the sabotage done to the airships to leave them vulnerable to the Skaar's secret attack plans. They convince her to return to the Skaar king and tell him to stick to the truce. She does, but the king laughs and refuses, so she kills him. She then slips away to live a quiet life in the Four Lands.

Back at the Behemoth, Brecon uses the Elfstones to find Ajin. Dar and Brecon then attempt a rescue, but they are caught by the Pretender and her wolf-men. Brecon uses the Elfstones to reveal to the wolf-men who they once were, and that they were turned into the beasts they are by the Pretender. They rip her apart in anger, allowing Brecon, Dar, Ajin, and her mother to escape. The people of Skaarsland recognize Ajin immediately and crown her queen. She orders the Skaar army home and becomes busy with royal life. Dar feels out of place, despite his love for her, so he leaves after her coronation.

Tindall and Rocan take the Behemoth up to use Annabelle just as a massive winter storm descends upon Skaarsland. They force Shea to stay behind with Seelah due to the danger. As they activate Annabelle, the Behemoth is struck by lightening and explodes before the process can complete, shooting the chemicals across the sky. Shea witnesses this from the ground and devastated at the loss of his friends screams a violent burst of Wishsong, that he didn't even know he had, igniting the chemicals properly and stopping the winter storm. The clouds break, and Skaarsland enjoys its first warm day in years as the weather changes favorably.

Back at Emberen, Tarsha has her final confrontation with Clizia Porse. Clizia sends the Jachyra to attack her first. Fade and Flinc aid her in battling the demon, but it nearly defeats them. Grianne then arrives and uses her Wishsong to destroy the Jachyra, leaving her weak. Tarsha then uses her Wishsong to destroy Clizia Porse. Grianne uses her Wishsong to heal Fade and Flinc. Grianne gives Tarsha a letter Drisker had written to her in case he didn't make it. She then returns to Mother Tanequil where she becomes a spirit once more. Grianne speaks to Tarsha in her spirit form letting her know that she is finally home.

Shea reunites with Tarsha at Emberen and asks her to teach him how to use his newfound Wishsong. Brecon and Dar return to Arborlon, where Brecon returns the Elfstones. Dar then returns to Leah. After a time, Ajin comes to him and admits that her counselors won't accept him as her husband now, but that he can serve as her Blade and protector. A wedding will come later, she promises. Shea and Tarsha return to Paranor. Tarsha begins to have feelings for Shea and wonders if he is her true love. She finally reads Drisker's letter, in which he confirms Tarsha's suspicions that Allanon anointed her a druid, but he writes that it is her choice as to whether she accepts. With science on the rise, she contemplates whether the world needs magic anymore. She knows that whatever choice she makes, she will change the world.

== Characters ==
The characters are:

- Agathien d'Amphere is the pretender, wife of the King of Skaarsland, and would be usurper.
- Ajin d'Amphere is a princess from the island nation of Skaarsland near the continent of Eurodia, and daughter of Cor d'Amphere.
- Annabelle is a machine that can allegedly change the weather. Tindall thinks she is alive.
- Battenhyle is a dwarf commander that runs The Revealer.
- Belladrin Rish (real name Eris'Sin) is personal assistant to the murdered Ketter Vause, revealed to be a skilled Skaar Penetrator (spy).
- Brecon Elessedil is an Elven prince, fourth son of King Gerrendren Elesedil.
- Choten Benz is a commander in the Federation army.
- Clizia Porse is an evil Druid with plans to take over Paranor as Ard Rhys of a new Druid Order.
- Darcon (Dar) Leah is the High Druid's Blade, the commander of the guard at Paranor.
- Fade is giant moor cat.
- Flinc is a forest Imp, in love with Tarsha.
- Ketter Vause is the Federation Prime Minister.
- Orestiana d'Amphere is the mother of Ajin, former wife of the King of Skaarsland.
- Lakodan is a dwarf commander that runs The Revealer.
- Paranor is the Druid Keep.
- Rocan Arneas is the financier of Annabelle.
- Seelah is a beautiful cat-like shapeshifter, that can be invisible.
- Tarsha Kaynin is sister to Tavo, Wishsong wielder and student of Drisker Arc.
- Tindall is the inventor of Annabelle, using Old World science.

== Reception ==
Publishers Weekly wrote that "the story's bare bones will strike many readers as too close to the framework of the Star Wars movies for comfort: a young woman with mystical powers, who has been mentored by an older wizard, must confront another magic user who has turned to the dark side and so betrayed her mystical order. Even longtime fans will likely be happy that Brooks is moving on to a completely new imagined world."

Aidan Moher of Reactor writes that The Fall of Shannara "is epic, complex, and features some of Brooks's finest thematic explorations. As a conclusion to the story that started with Ilse Witch, it works well, providing a satisfying climax and believable closure to Brooks's greatest character. As a conclusion to the entire Shannara series, it feels a little flat, like it's lost touch with themes and ideas explored in its earliest volume." Moher goes on to write that "Shannara is one [of] fantasy's greatest achievements. It's [sic] longevity and ambition should be acknowledged. When Brooks was at his best, his novels sing with a clear, hopeful voice that reminds us all of why we read epic fantasy in the first place."

The book entered The New York Times Best Seller list in November 2020.
