= Paragon =

Paragon may refer to:

== Places ==
- Paragon, Indiana, a town in the United States
- Paragon, Nebraska, former community in the United States
- The Paragon, Bath, a Georgian street in the Walcot area of Bath
- The Paragon, Blackheath, London, built by Michael Searles
- McLaren Technology Centre, formerly called the Paragon Technology Centre
- Hull Paragon Interchange, a railway station and transportation complex in Kingston upon Hull, England
- Paragon International School (Cambodia), a private school in Phnom Penh, Cambodia
- Paragon International University, a private university in Phnom Penh, Cambodia
- Paragon Cafe, Katoomba, a restaurant located in Katoomba, New South Wales, Australia

=== Shopping malls ===
- Paragon, Singapore, a shopping mall in the Orchard Road area of Singapore
- Siam Paragon, a shopping mall in Siam area, Bangkok, Thailand

== Companies ==
- Paragon Cable, a cable company based in Minneapolis; acquired by Time Warner Cable in 1999
- Paragon China, a British manufacturer of bone china
- Paragon Gaming, an American casino company
- Paragon Group of Companies, a British mortgage lender
- Paragon Software, a video game company founded in 1987
- Paragon Software Group, a software company founded in 1994
- Paragon Solutions, an Israeli spyware company
- Paragon Space Development Corporation, a space hardware company
- Paragon Studios, a video game company founded in 2007
- Parragon Books Ltd, a United Kingdom publishing company

== Arts and entertainment ==
=== Comics ===
- Paragon (Cooper Roth), a superhero from Marvel Comics
- Paragon (Maya), a fictional character in the video game Marvel Nemesis: Rise of the Imperfects
- Paragon (DC Comics), a supervillain

=== Gaming ===
- Paragon (video game), a cancelled MOBA video game
- Paragon, an elite member of Dwarven society, revered like a god by Dwarves in the game Dragon Age: Origins
- Paragon, one of the professions available in the PC game Guild Wars Nightfall
- Paragon City, a fictional city in the computer game City of Heroes
- Paragon Levels, a leveling system in the computer game Diablo 3
- Paragon points, a type of scoring/level system in the game series Mass Effect
- Paragon, a solid-state pinball table from Bally Manufacturing.
- Paragon, a type of upgrade in Bloons TD 6

=== Music ===
- Paragon, a 2004 album by Exists
- Paragon, a 2023 album by Floor Jansen
- "Paragon", a song by Northlane from the album Mesmer, 2017
- "Paragon", a song by Omnium Gatherum from the album Origin, 2021
- Paragon (band), a heavy metal band from Germany
- The Paragons, a ska and rocksteady vocal group from Kingston, Jamaica
- Paragon cymbals, a line of cymbals made by Sabian, designed specifically for drummer Neil Peart

=== Other uses in arts and entertainment ===
- JBL Paragon, an iconic loudspeaker system from JBL
- John Paragon (1954–2021), actor, writer, and director
- Paragon, a sentient vessel from Robin Hobb's Liveship Traders Trilogy

== Other uses ==
- British Rail Class 802, a type of train, some of which are branded Paragon
- Paragon (typography), the size of type between great primer and double pica, standardized as 20-point
- Paragon (diamond), a diamond that originated in Brazil weighing 137.82 carats
- Paragon CRT, a method of corneal refraction developed by Paragon Vision Sciences
- Paragon Restaurant, Indian restaurant
- Paragon (restaurant), now defunct US restaurant chain
- Intel Paragon, a series of massively parallel supercomputers
- HMS Paragon, the name of two ships of the Royal Navy
- Paragon, a mountain bike in the Gary Fisher Collection

== See also ==
- Paragons (disambiguation)
