= Park Avenue (Kochi) =

Major street in Kochi, India

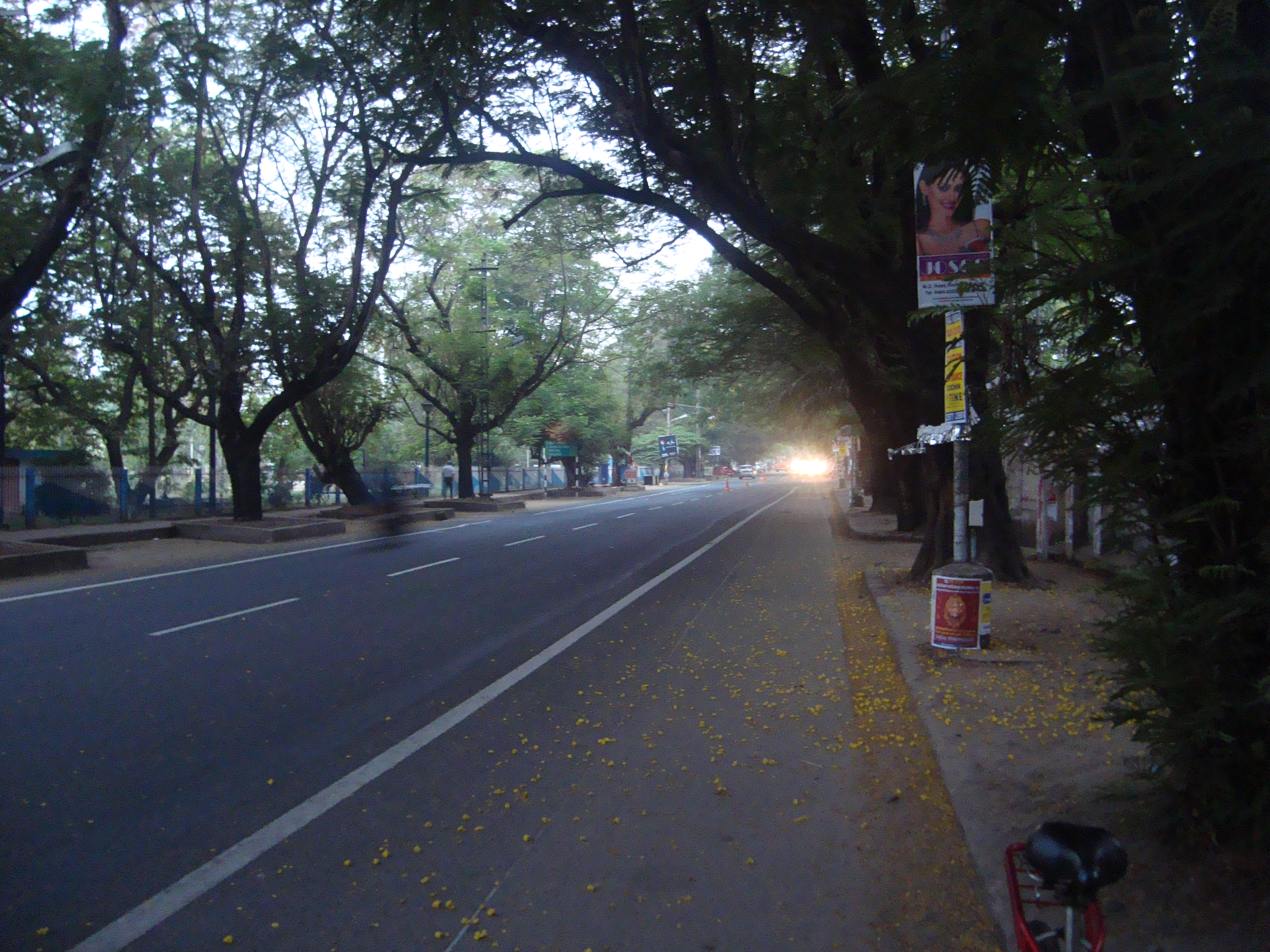

Route information
- Length: 1.5 km (0.93 mi)

Location
- Country: India
- State: Kerala

Highway system
- Roads in India; Expressways; National; State; Asian; State Highways in Kerala

Park Avenue is a major road starting from the western end of Durbar Hall Road to Broadway in the city of Kochi, India. Two major parks, Subhash Bose Park and Indira Priyadarshini Park are situated along the road, hence the name. Several notable historical buildings are also located alongside the road. The 1.5 km road has many flowering trees planted on both sides, forming a thick canopy and extends further north towards Shanmugham Road.

== History ==
The idea of the new road came up in 1903, when Kochi Maharaja Rajarishi Rama Varma (1895–1914), was travelling to attend the Kochi Durbar. The king was well known for his deep passion for gardening and nature. He felt a need for beautiful tree-lined roads similar to those in Europe and America. He directed the Diwan to lay a new park where the public can unwind in evenings. Thus a new park came up in the open space opposite Ernakulam Shiva Temple facing sea, named as Rama Varma Park. The king ordered for beautifying the road bordering the park with a wide variety of flowering trees like Gulmohar etc. The king even passed a law prohibiting any person cutting down the trees, even branches without sanction of Royal court. The beauty of road impressed the Hon. British Resident of Kochi, that he renamed the street as Park Avenue.

The beauty of stretch was so impressive that several important institutions were later established in this stretch. This includes the Kochi State Legislature Assembly Building (current Government Law College, Ernakulam), Kochi Royal Huzur Cutchery (Secretariat- the current Taluk Office), Raja's court of Appeal (current Ernakulam District Courts), Royal Medical Office (current DMO office), Diwan's Bungalow (current Government Guest House), Ernakulam Mayor House (current Corporation of Cochin office) and St.Teresa's College. These were in addition to the existing major structures, the Maharaja's College, Ernakulam and General Hospital Ernakulam. The annual Durbar processions which normally used to take place in Chittoor Road, was later shifted to this stretch.

The road has seen several major agitations as part of Indian Independence movements. In the 1930s, the students of Maharaja's College lead a major agitation against Kingdom of Cochin which was brutally suppressed with the help of armed police. The Park was the main venue for Civil disobedience movement in Kochi. It was for the first time that a major agitation was called, against an Indian princely state, which spearhead the Indian National Congress to spread Independence movement into princely states. The Park Avenue was one of the first places where the Aikya Kerala Vedi (Forum for United Kerala) started its agitations for uniting 2 princely states of Kochi and Travancore.

On 15 August 1947 the Park witnessed the ceremony lowering of Kochi Kingdom's Flag for fluttering Indian Tricolour as per Kochi Raja's directive (who was the first Indian prince to join Indian Union willingly). After Independence, the road was taken over by Ernakulam Municipality and retained in the same way as desired by its founder- Maharaja Rajarishi.

== Major Landmarks/Junctions ==
- Gandhi Round, the Park avenue starts from Gandhi Rounds where a Gandhi Statue is installed.
- West Gate of Ernakulam Shiva Temple
- The Kanayannur Taluk office, which was the old Secretariat complex of Kochi Kingdom, built in traditional style. The sprawling complex is a heritage structure. The Registar's Office and Treasury is located in this complex.
- The District Court complex is continuous part of Taluk Office which was originally the Raja's Court of Appeal. New additions were added to back side of the original structure.
- The Maharaja's College, one of the famous Arts and Science College in India
- Ernakulam General Hospital and Hospital Campus
- Office of Cochin Corporation and Mayor's Office
- Kochi Revenue Tower, a modern 24 storied glass tower built recently. The Commissioner of Cochin City Police has its office here. All Government offices in the city are planned to shift to this complex soon.
- St. Mary's Orthodox Cathedral, Estd. 1926, the Mother Church of all Indian Orthodox Churches in the City
- Government Maharaja's Law College Complex which was the original Legislature Assembly Hall of Cochin State during Monarchy days.
- Kochi Municipal Corporation Guest House
- St.Teresa's College and Convent
- Government Guest House and KTDC Hotel, PWD Guest House

The road ends at entrance of Broadway, Kochi. All the above structures are located on eastern side of the Road whereas the western side is occupied with Park. Apart from Subhash Chandra Bose Park and Indira Priyadarshini Children's Park, a large open ground called Rajendra Maidan and a small lawn gardens called Ambedkar Park also exists. The Main Ernakulam Boat Jetty is located in middle of Park Avenue.

== See also ==
- Roads in Kerala
