= Kayees Rahmathulla Hotel =

Indian restaurant

Restaurant information
- Established: May 22, 1948; 78 years ago
- Food type: Kerala cuisine
- Location: Gujarati Road, Near Gujarati Temple, Mattancherry, Kochi, Kerala, 682002, Kochi, India
- Other locations: Durbar Hall Road, Ernakulam South, Ernakulam, Kerala, 682016

Kayees Rahmathulla Hotel is an Indian restaurant in Kochi, Kerala. The restaurant is known for its Mutton Biryani which is known as Kayikka's Biryani. It was founded by V. K. Kayee in 1948 and enjoys cult status.

== History ==
V. K Kayee, popularly known as Kaikka (Brother Kaee), worked as a cook and waiter in the British Army in the 1940s. Later he started working as a waiter at Bombay Hotel in Kochi. In 1948, he started a tea shop in Mattancherry which was named Hotel Rahmatullah. In 1951, he converted it into a proper restaurant under the name Kayees Rahmatullah Hotel. The restaurant special dish was the Mutton biryani which became famous among the residents across Kochi. By word of mouth, fame began to spread to places outside the region. After Kayee's death in 1999, the restaurant was taken over by his son and grandson. Currently the restaurant operates in two locations, the original hotel in Mattancherry and a new hotel located near Durbar Hall Ground in Ernakulam.

== See also ==
- Bharath Coffee House
- Paragon Restaurant
