= Dark Legacy =

(The) Dark Legacy may refer to:

- The Dark Legacy, a 2003 heavy-metal album by Paragon
- The Dark Legacy of Shannara, a 2010s fantasy novel series by Terry Brooks
- Gauntlet Dark Legacy, a 1999 arcade and video game
- Dark Legacy, a 1996 novel (part of List of Magic: The Gathering novels)
