= Subhash Bose Park =

Public park in Kochi, India

- Subhash Park / Rama Varma Park
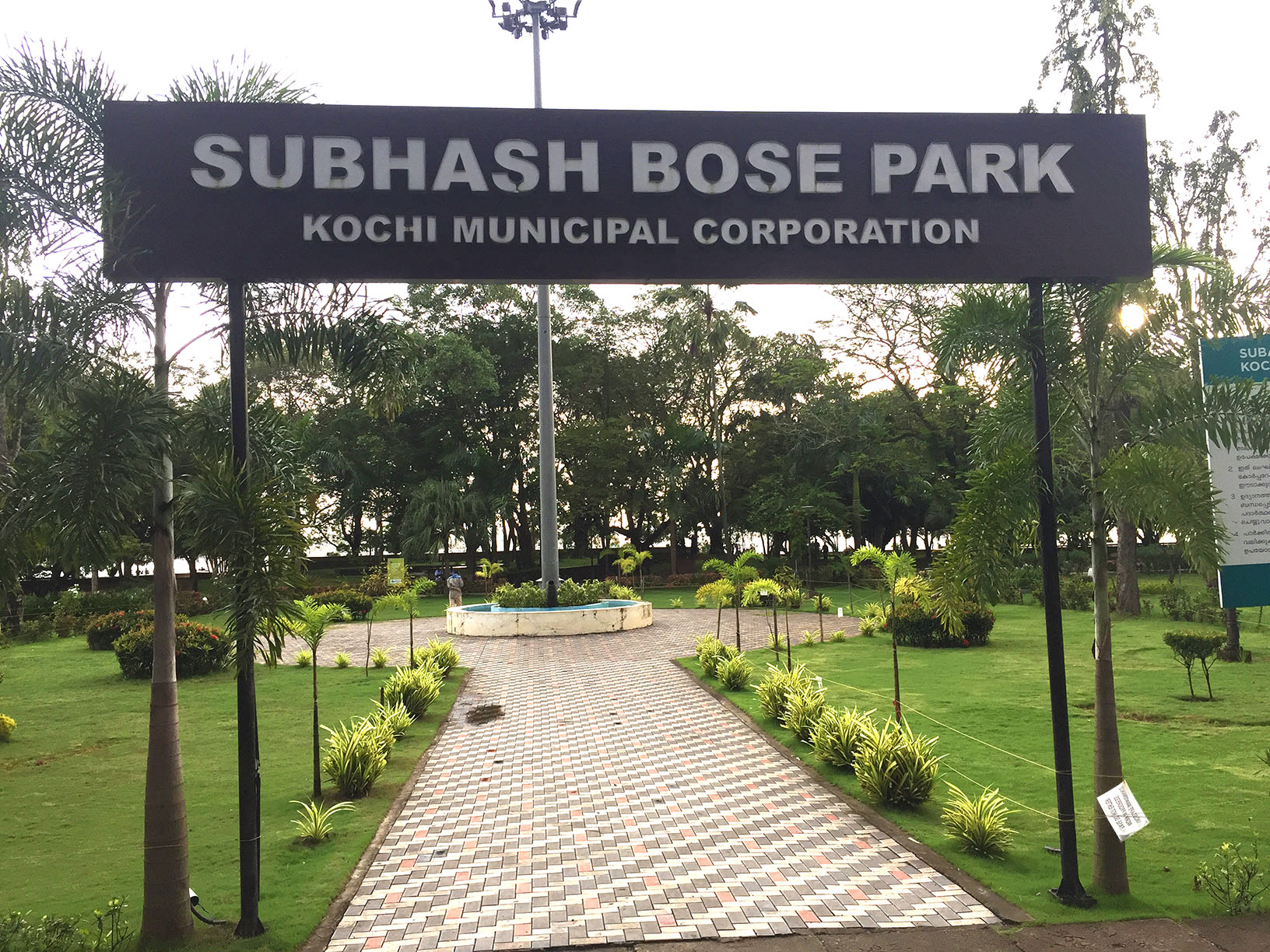
- Nameboard at the park entrance
- Interactive map of Subhash Bose Park
- Type: Public urban park
- Location: Park Avenue, Kochi, Kerala, India
- Coordinates: 9.9706°N 76.2794°E
- Area: 11.5 acres (4.7 ha)
- Opened: 1903; 123 years ago
- Operator: Kochi Municipal Corporation
- Status: Open year-round

Subhash Bose Park, commonly known as Subhash Park, is an 11.5-acre (4.7 ha) waterfront public park in Kochi, Kerala, India. Situated along Park Avenue in Ernakulam, the park overlooks Vembanad Lake and Cochin Port. Established in 1903 during the rule of the Kingdom of Cochin, it is one of the primary public green spaces in central Kochi.

== History ==
The park was established in 1903 under the reign of Rama Varma XV, the Maharaja of Cochin. Initially named Rama Varma Park, the grounds faced the Ernakulam Shiva Temple and the backwaters. The adjacent street was subsequently named Park Avenue.

During the Indian independence movement, the park served as a venue for political gatherings and events linked to the Civil Disobedience Movement in Cochin. Following independence, the park was renamed in honor of Subhas Chandra Bose.

In 2015, the Kochi Municipal Corporation and the Centre for Heritage, Environment and Development (C-HED) completed a ₹3-crore renovation of the park, upgrading its infrastructure, pathways, lighting, and landscaping.

== Features and layout ==
Subhash Bose Park contains paved walking tracks, lawns, seating, an open-air gym, and a children's play area. The western edge of the grounds faces the shipping channel, Willingdon Island, and local ferry routes. Facilities include a musical walkway equipped with integrated sound systems, as well as several outdoor sculptures and statues, including a monument to Maharaja Rama Varma XV.

== Location and accessibility ==
Subhash Bose Park is located on Park Avenue in Ernakulam, adjacent to the Ernakulam Main Boat Jetty and opposite Maharaja's College. The park is accessible via the Ernakulam South railway station and the Maharaja's College metro station.

== Gallery ==
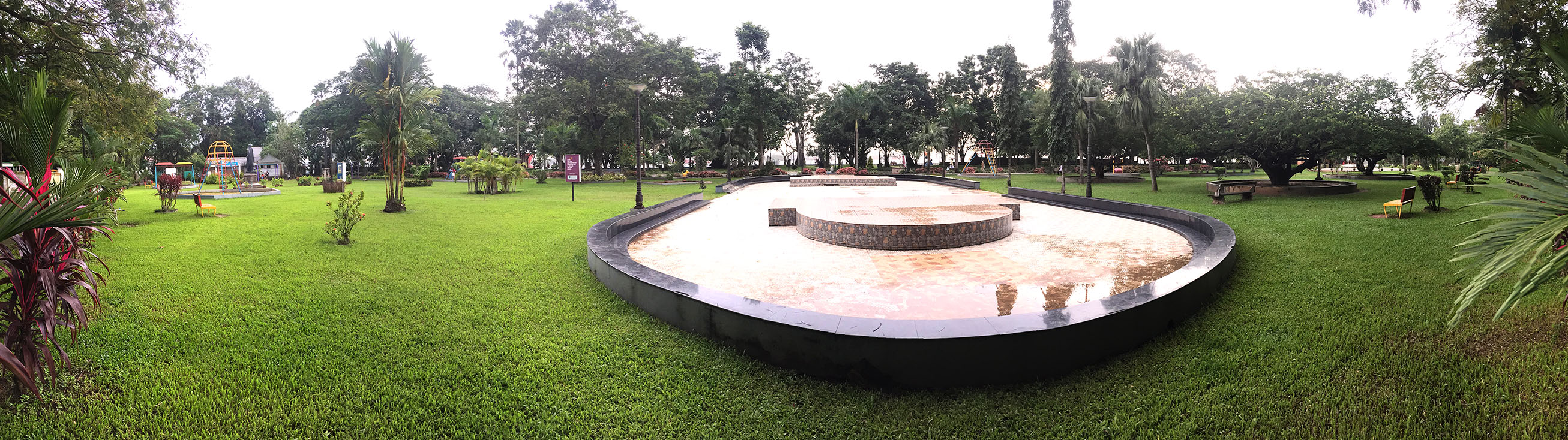
Panoramic view towards the northern side of the park

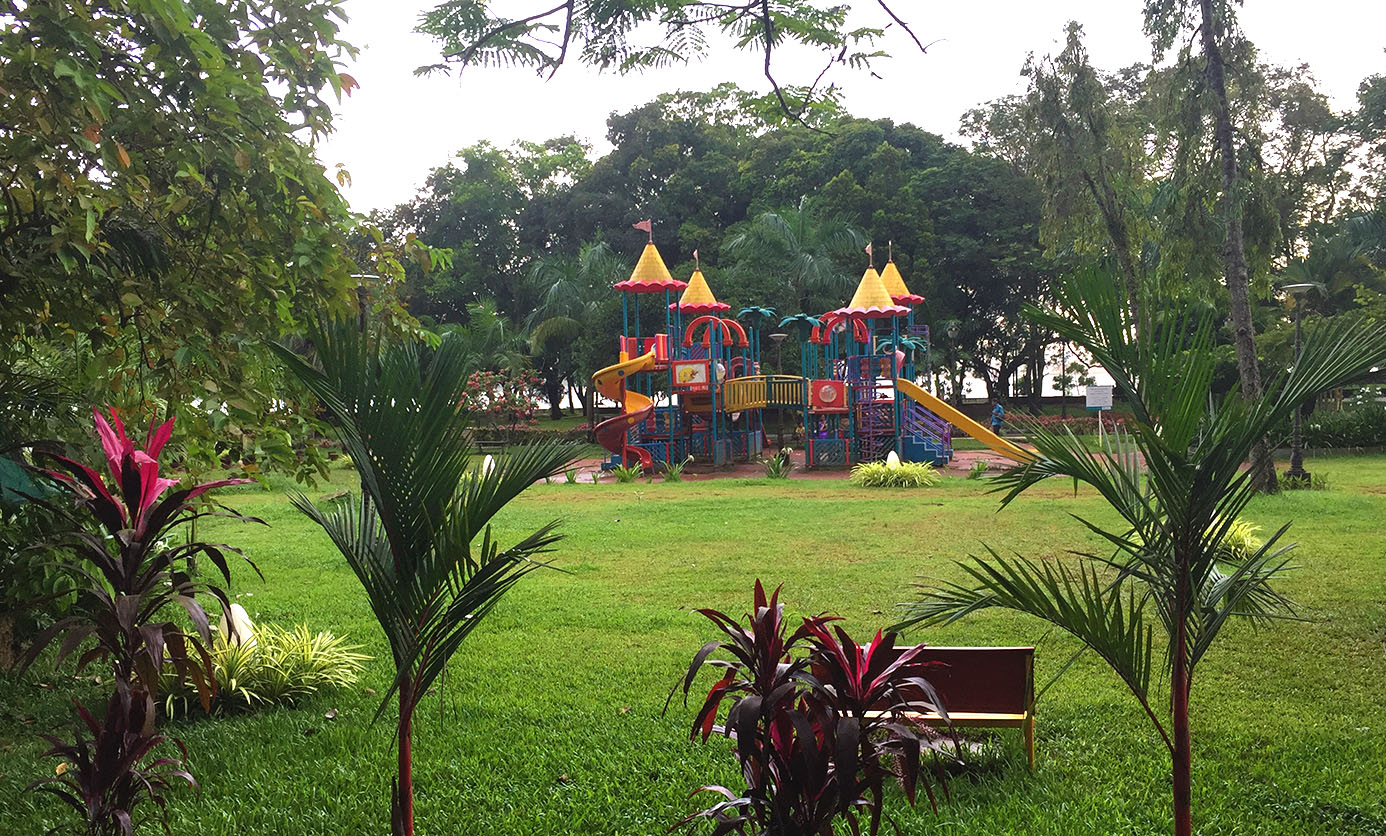
Park playground

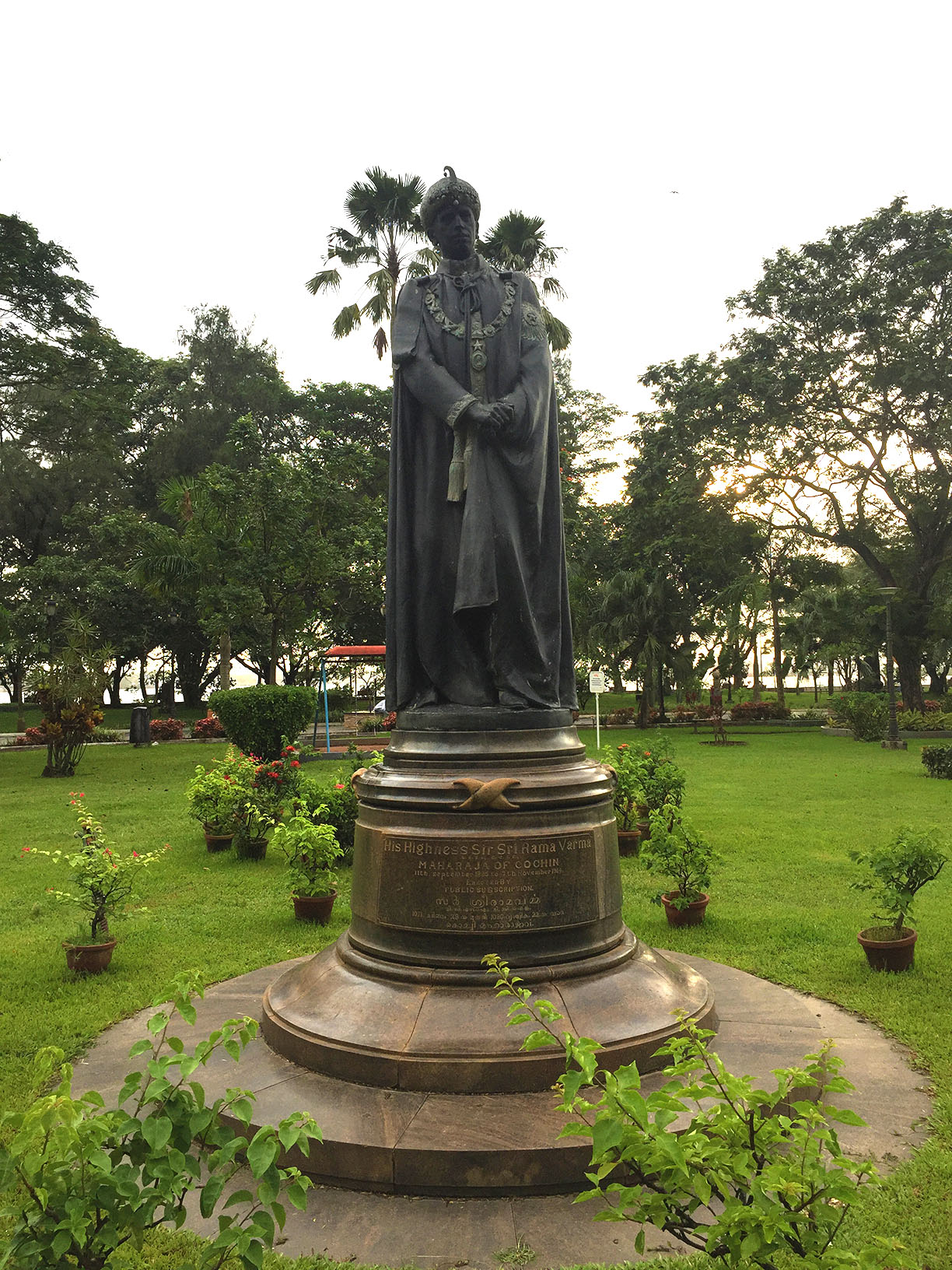
Statue of Rama Varma XV, who established the park in 1903

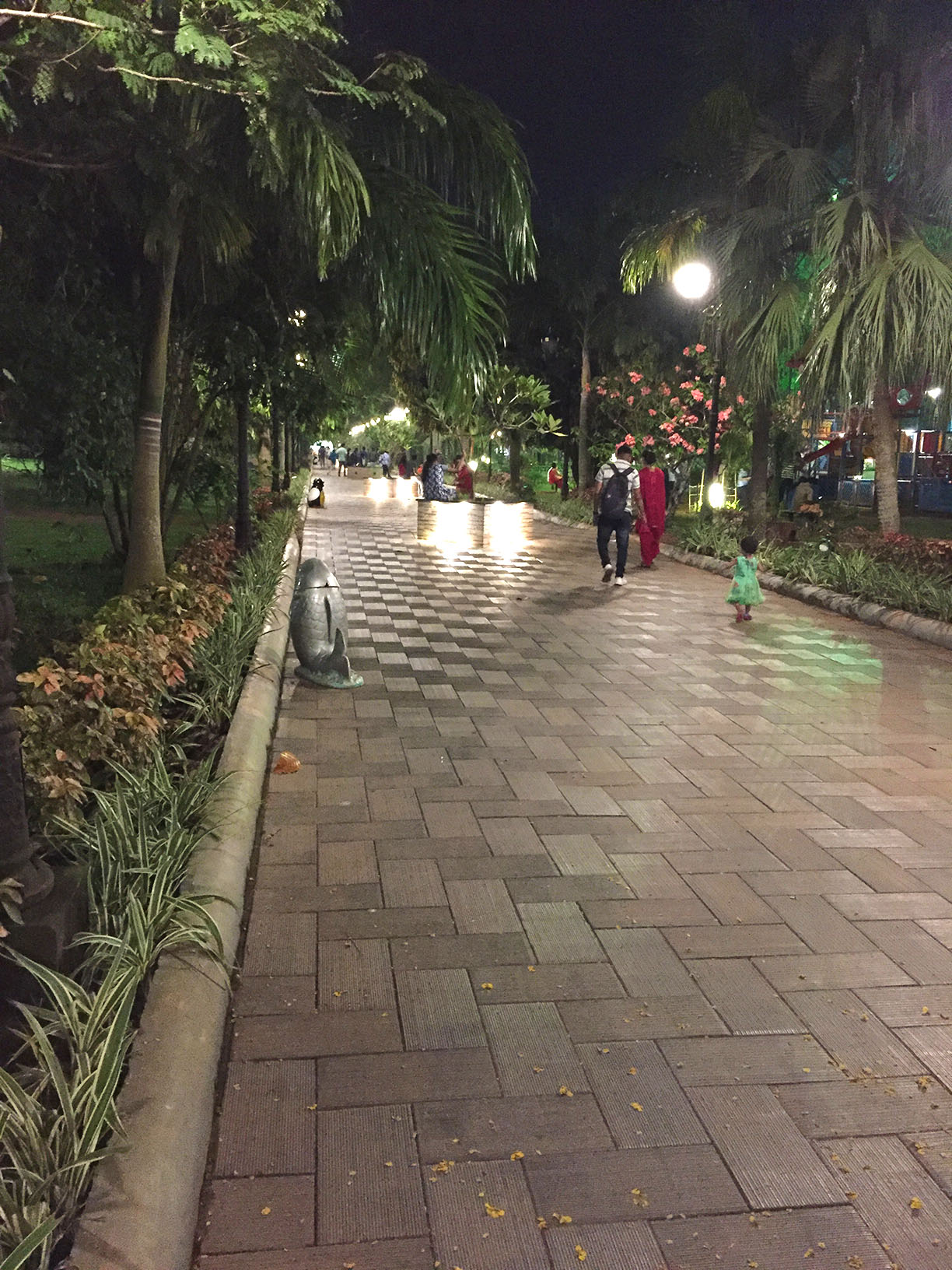
Walkway inside the park

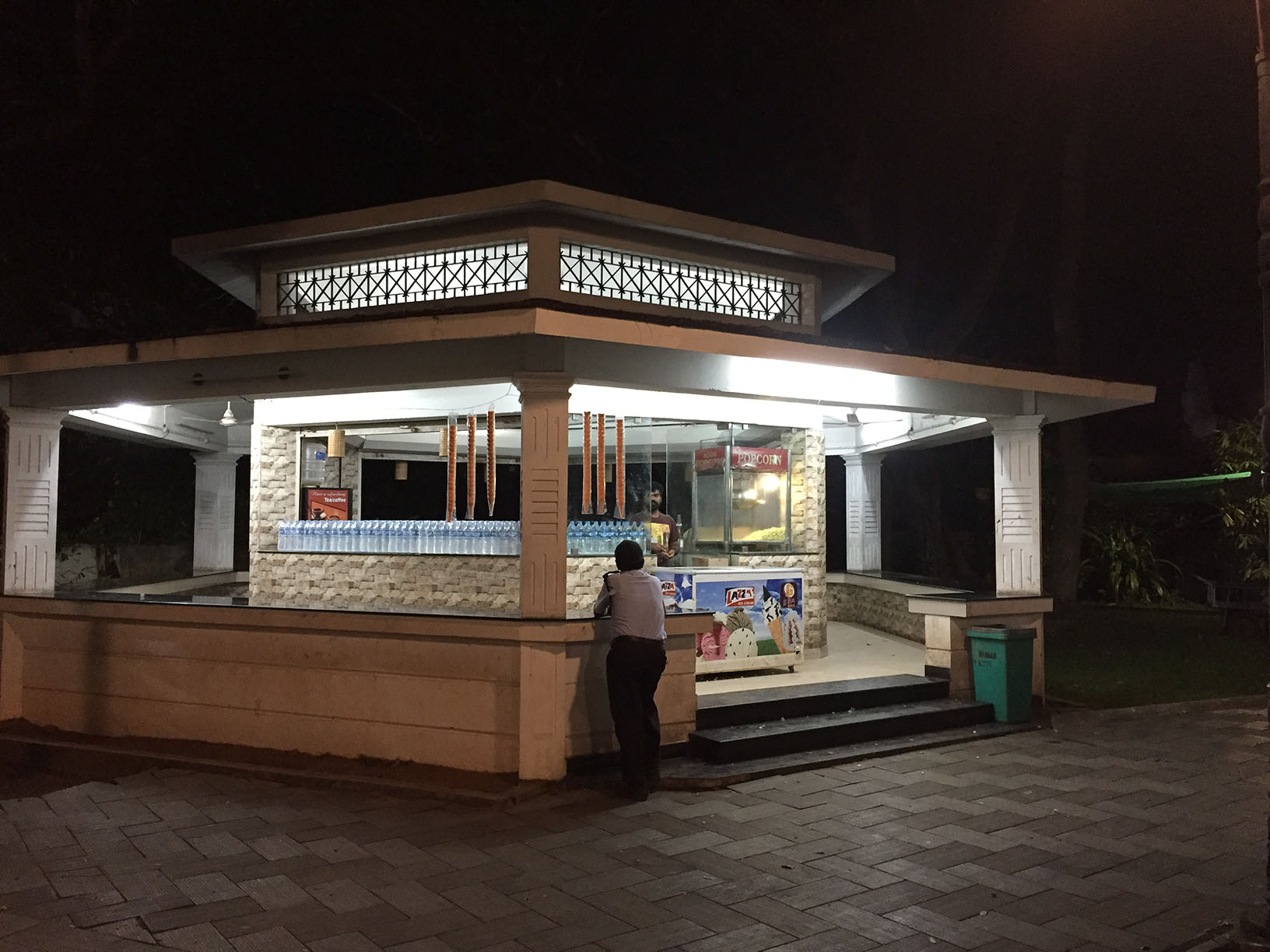
A kiosk inside the park

== See also ==
- Marine Drive, Kochi
