= The Dark Legacy of Shannara =

Novel trilogy by Terry Brooks

- First editions
- Wards of Faerie (2012); Bloodfire Quest (2013); Witch Wraith (2013)
- Author: Terry Brooks
- Cover artist: Stephen Youll
- Country: United States
- Language: English
- Discipline: Epic fantasy
- Publisher: Del Rey Books
- Published: August 21, 2012 – July 16, 2013
- Media type: Print (hardback & paperback)
- No. of books: 3
- Website: www.terrybrooks.net

The Dark Legacy of Shannara is the title of a series of novels written by Terry Brooks. The first book, Wards of Faerie, was released by Del Rey Books in August 2012. These novels take place a century after the High Druid of Shannara trilogy, telling the quest of Khyber Elessedil to recover the lost Elfstones.

== Books ==
=== Wards of Faerie (2012) ===
The people of the Four Lands have become distrustful of magic after the failure of the Third Druid Council. One druid uncovers information that could lead to the rediscovery of the lost Elfstones, which Ard Rhys of Paranor Khyber Elessedil now seeks.

=== Bloodfire Quest (2013) ===
Aphenglow and her sister Arlingfant seek a way to reseal the Forbidding, whilst Khyber and Redden are still stuck within at the mercy of the Straken lord. Meanwhile, Railing searches for a way to save his brother.

=== Witch Wraith (2013) ===
Set 100 years after Straken, it chronicles the attempts of two sisters, Arling & Aphen Elessedil to repair a breach in the Forbidding—and the attempt of Railing Ohmsford to bring back his relative Grianne (the former Ilse Witch) to release his brother Redden from the Forbidding and destroy the Straken lord Tael Riverine.
