= Bharath Coffee House =

Indian restaurant

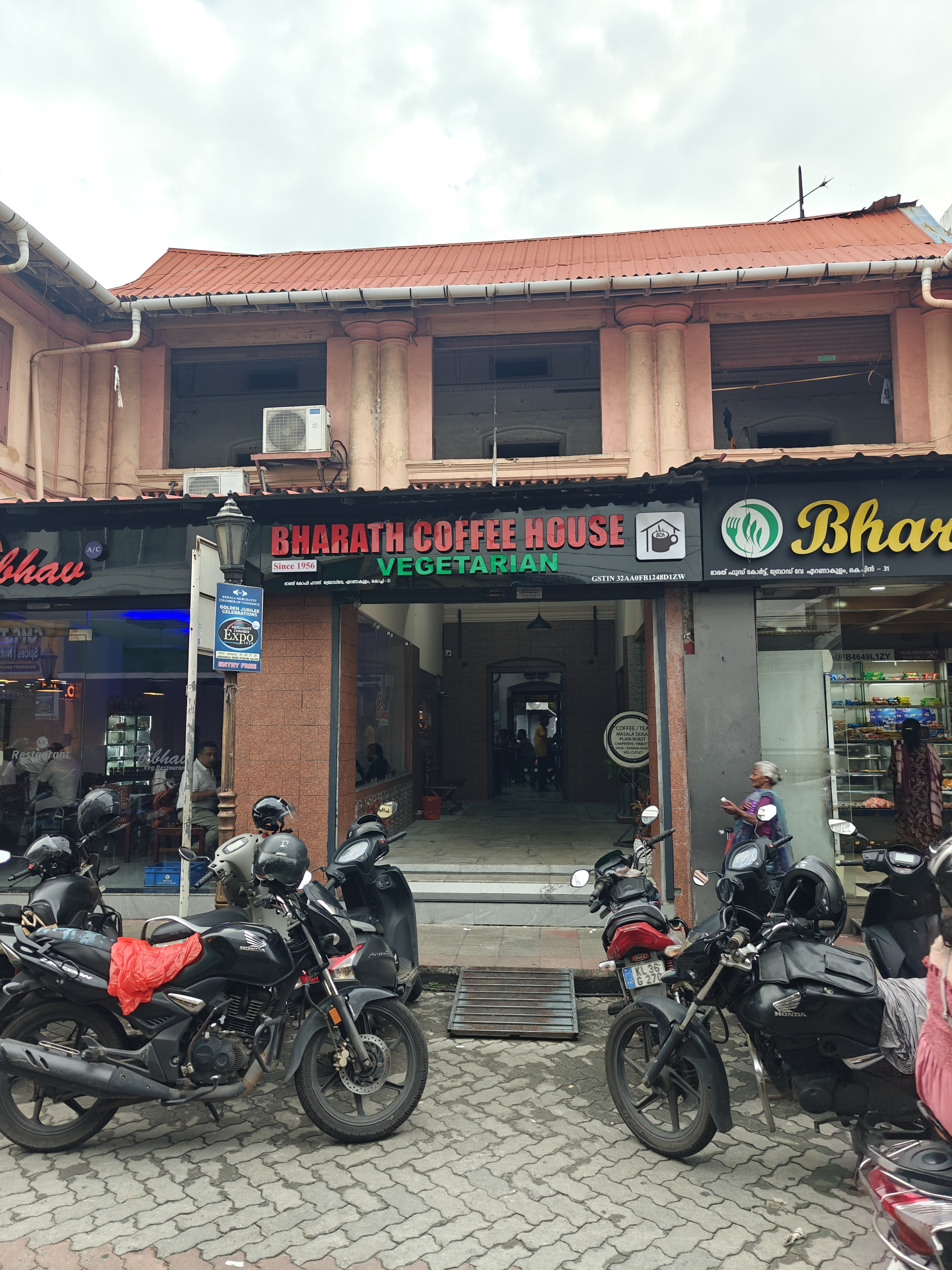
- Entrance to the restaurant in 2026

Restaurant information
- Established: January 26, 1956; 70 years ago
- Food type: Kerala cuisine
- Location: Shanmugham Road, Broadway, Ernakulam, Kerala, 682031, Kochi, India
- Seating capacity: 110

Bharath Coffee House is an Indian vegetarian restaurant in Kochi, Kerala. Located in Broadway, the restaurant was founded by B. Govinda Rao in 1956. It is one of the oldest restaurants in Kochi, which is still functioning.

== History ==
Bharath Coffee House was founded by B Govinda Rao. Actress Kamini Kaushal officially inaugurated it on 26 January 1956. Rao was a former employee of the Coconut Development Board and became a hotel's partner. The building of the hotel which dates back to 1919 was owned by several people over time. It was ultimately purchased by Rao who started the hotel. It soon rose to prominence as a favoured hangout, especially for young people, businesspeople, and musicians. It also became a meeting place for coffee and chatter.

== See also ==
- Kayees Rahmathulla Hotel
