= Wards of Faerie =

2012 novel by Terry Brooks

- First edition
- Author: Terry Brooks
- Language: English
- Series: The Dark Legacy of Shannara
- Subject: Shannara
- Genre: Fantasy
- Publisher: Del Rey Books
- Publication date: August 21, 2012
- Publication place: United States
- Media type: Print, audiobook, e-book
- Pages: 384 pages
- ISBN: 0345523474
- Preceded by: Straken
- Followed by: Bloodfire Quest

Wards of Faerie is a fantasy novel by American writer Terry Brooks. Published in 2012, it is the first part of The Dark Legacy of Shannara trilogy. The book was released on August 21, 2012 through Del Rey Books. Set a century after Straken, it chronicles the attempts of Ard Rhys of Paranor Khyber Elessedil as she tries to recover the lost Elfstones.

== Plot summary ==
The story takes place in the Four Lands, 100 years after the previous trilogy. People have grown ever increasingly distrustful of magic and its wielders, ever since the Third Council of Druids. The potential to once again find the lost Elfstones of Faerie could change that for the better, assuming that the Ard Rhys survives the attempt.

== Reception ==
Critical reception has been mostly positive, with RT Book Reviews giving Wards of Faerie four stars. Kirkus Reviews and Publishers Weekly also gave positive reviews, with Publishers Weekly praising the audiobook's narration.
