= Law of the Blade =

Law Of The Blade

Studio album by Paragon
- Released: 2002
- Recorded: Powerhouse Studios, Hamburg, Germany
- Genre: Heavy metal, power metal
- Label: Remedy Records
- Producer: Piet Sielck

Paragon chronology
Steelbound (2001)	Law Of The Blade (2002)	The Dark Legacy (2003)

Law of the Blade is a full-length studio album by German heavy metal band Paragon, released in 2002.

== Track listing ==
1. "Abducted" – 03:55
2. "Palace of Sin" – 03:55
3. "Armies of the Tyrant" – 05:02
4. "Law of the Blade" – 03:32
5. "Across the Wastelands" – 07:01
6. "Shadow World" – 05:33
7. "Allied Forces" – 05:28
8. "Empire's Fall" – 03:38
9. "The Journey's End" – 05:03
10. "Back to Glory" – 05:08

== Credits ==
- Andreas Babuschkin – lead vocals
- Martin Christian – guitars, backing vocals
- Claudius Cremer – guitars
- Jan Bünning – bass, backing vocals
- Markus Corby – drums

All music written and arranged by Paragon.
All lyrics by Babuschkin, except "Palace of Sin" and "Empire's Fall" by Christian.
