= Tanequil =

2004 novel by Terry Brooks

- Cover art of Tanequil
- Author: Terry Brooks
- Cover artist: Art: Steve Stone; Design: David Stevevson
- Language: English
- Series: High Druid of Shannara
- Genre: Fantasy
- Publisher: Del Rey Books
- Publication date: 31 August 2004
- Publication place: United States
- Media type: Print (hardback & paperback)
- Pages: 368
- ISBN: 0-345-43574-5
- OCLC: 54487473
- Dewey Decimal: 813/.54 22
- LC Class: PS3552.R6596 T32 2004
- Preceded by: Jarka Ruus
- Followed by: Straken

Tanequil is a fantasy novel by American writer Terry Brooks, part of the High Druid of Shannara trilogy of the Shannara series. First published in 2004, the book takes place immediately after the events of Jarka Ruus and is followed by the novel Straken.

== Plot summary ==
Pen, Khyber, and company rescue Cinnaminson and continue their journey north, pursued continuously by traitorous Druids and the assassin Aphasia Wye. Meanwhile, the traitourous Druids find Pen's parents, Bek and Rue, and they agree to go back to Paranor to help to try to find their son Pen. The senior Ohmsfords recognize the deception and lies that the Druids have been telling them, so Bek attempts to locate Pen by using the magical scrye waters in the depths of Paranor. However, Bek and Rue are captured and unwillingly give Pen's position away.

Pen and his friends find allies among the Troll people, led by Kermadec and his semi-estranged brother Atalan, who aid them in locating the mystical Tanequil tree on a ravine-surrounded island. From the Tanequil, Pen receives the enchanted wooden "darkwand," a talisman that can aid him in saving his aunt. However, two of his fingers, as well as Cinnaminson, are taken in exchange. Pen and Aphasia meet in one last confrontation in which the assassin is killed by the Tanequil, but as Pen leaves the island, he finds the rest of his party taken hostage by the enemy Druid traitors.

Meanwhile, the corrupt Federation army has unleashed a devastating new airship-mounted weapon in their war against the Elven and Free-born armies. A shape-shifting Demon called the Moric, has crossed over into the Four Lands from the Forbidding in exchange for Grianne's banishment. This creature, who has taken the form of a Druid advisor to the Federation leader, is intent on using the weapon to destroy the Ellcrys tree in Arborlon, which would allow the Demon hordes from the Forbidding to flood into the Four Lands.

Finally, caged inside a Demon stronghold in the Forbidding, Grianne discovers the Straken Lord's master plan to have the Ellcrys destroyed, and how he manipulated Grianne's nemesis Shadea a'Ru to advance towards this goal. When Grianne is pitted in a contest against a horde of demonic Furies, she is forced to take a Demon-like form in a desperate attempt to survive. She then finds herself trapped in this form and unable to break free because she is unable to control the Wishsong's hold on her. However, the Straken Lord uses the enchanted conjure collar to subside her magic and she is again turned back to Grianne, but with the magic having taken an effect on her. Grianne's only hope for survival lies in the Straken Lord's former minion, Weka Dart.

== Characters ==
- Aphasia Wye
- Arling Elessedil
- Atalan
- Cinnaminson
- Etan Orek
- Gerand Cera
- Grianne Ohmsford
- Iridea Eleri
- Kermadec
- Kellen Elessedil
- Khyber Elessedil
- Moric, The
- Pen Ohmsford
- Pied Sanderling
- Pyson Wence
- Sen Dunsidan
- Shadea a'Ru
- Tael Riverine
- Tagwen
- Traunt Rowan
- Trefen Morys
- Weka Dart
