= Rama Varma Club =

Social club in Kochi, India

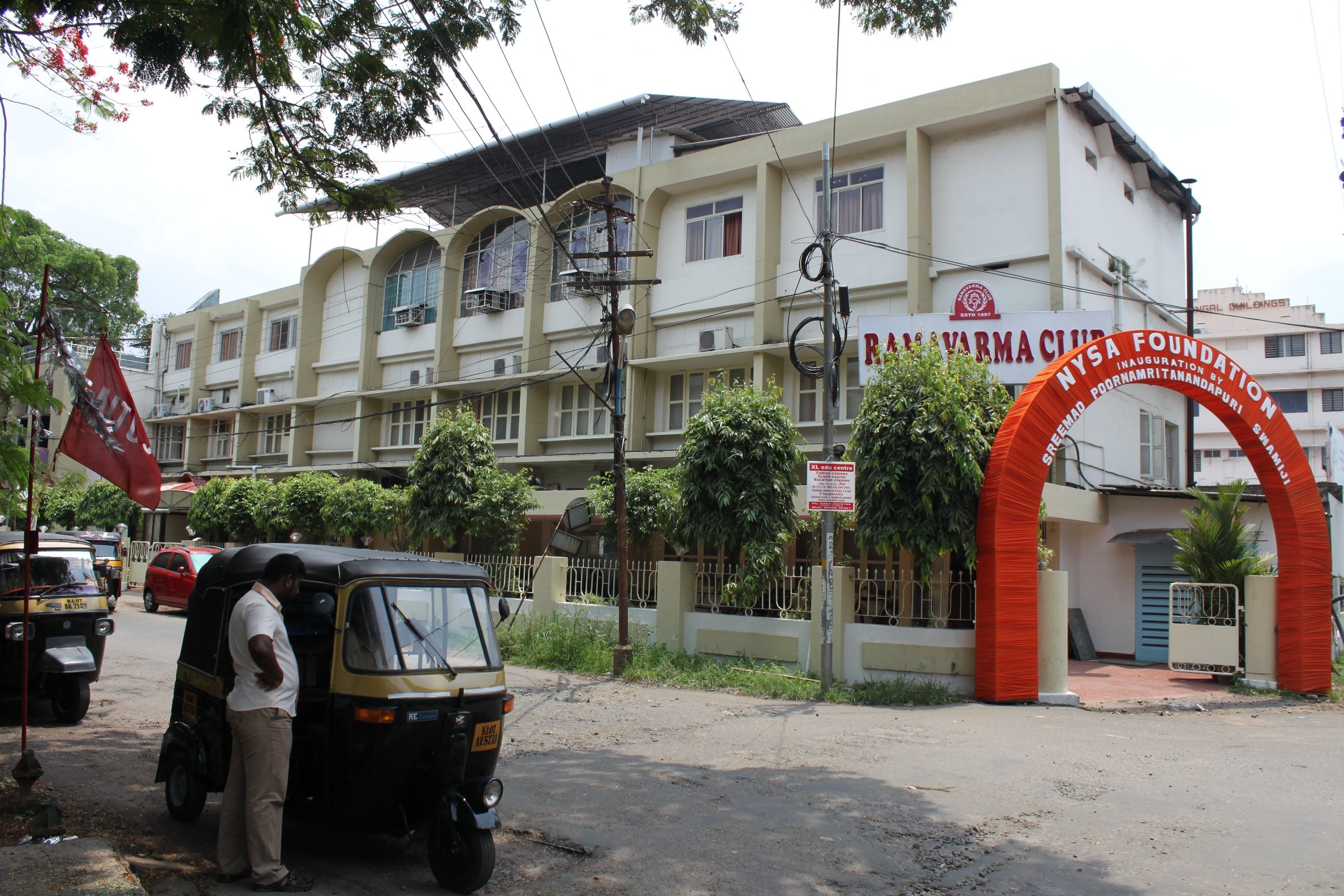
- Rama Varma Club
- Formation: 1897; 129 years ago
- Type: Social club
- Location: Kochi, Kerala, India

Rama Varma Club is a social club located in Kochi in the South Indian state of Kerala. Founded in 1897, it is one of the oldest social clubs in Kerala and South India. The club has traditionally been renowned for its tennis and billiards facilities. It has hosted several tennis and billiards competitions at the district and state levels.

== History ==
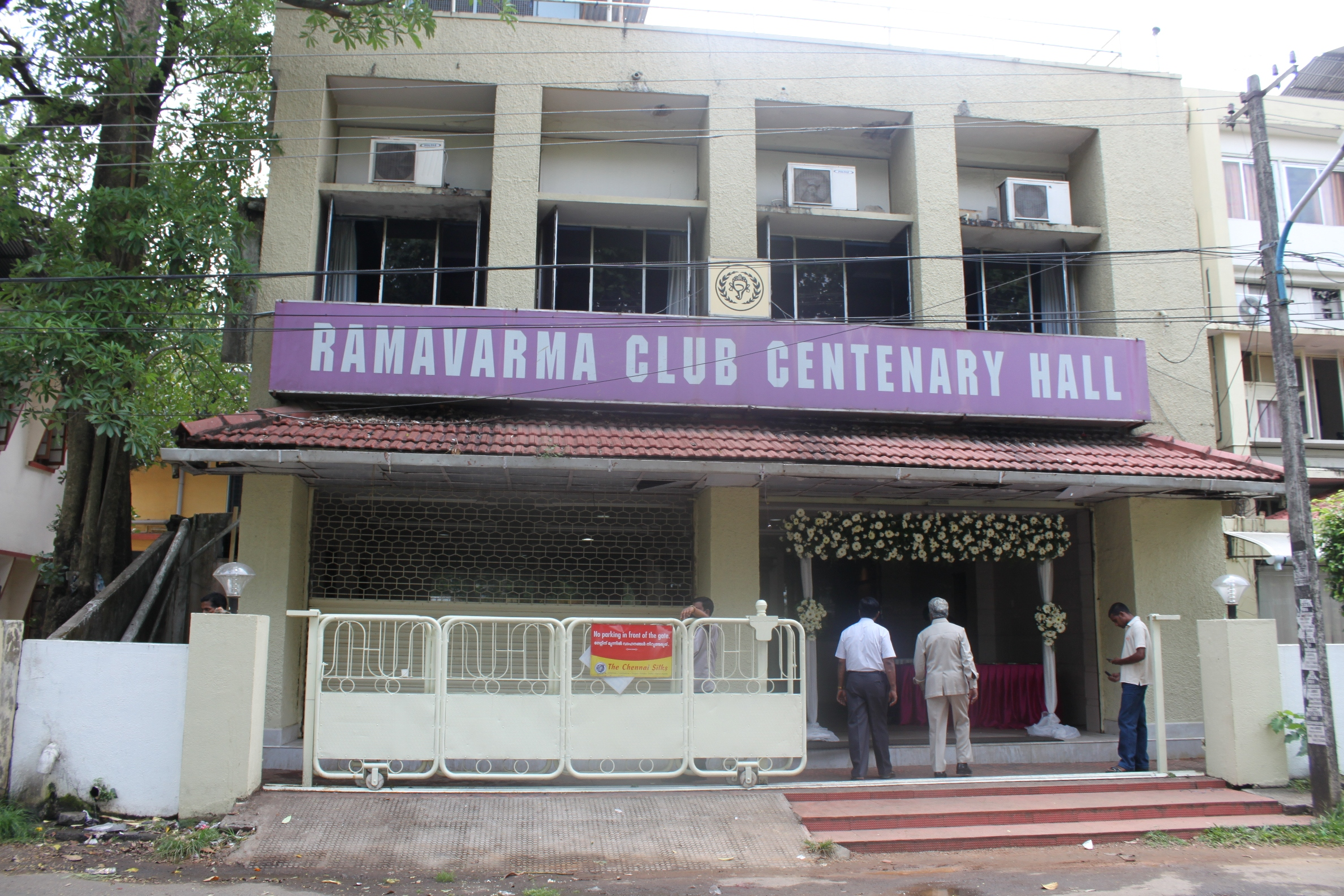
The centenary hall of the club

In the early 1897, a group of young men made a plea to Rama Varma XV, the Maharajah of Cochin, who was then the maharaja only in title. Their request was to give a building that would allow them to spend their evening hours in amiable surroundings and company, and partake in recreational and physical activities following court and office duties. Rama Varma Club, which was formerly known as Rama Varma Union Club, was born out of this at the Durbar Hall ground, Kochi. On 3 June 1897, the club's managing committee held its first meeting, at which time the officers and the committee that would oversee the club's operations were chosen. The club's inaugural president was Justice Narayana Marar. At that time, the majority of the club's members were lawyers and government employees. Back then, there were two structures. One of these housed the Cochin Commercial Bank's operations. The main sporting events were billiards, tennis, and cards, and the majority of the members went there every evening to unwind and socialise. Since 1914, the Ernakulam Town Cooperative Bank has operated out of Rama Varma Union Club, where the club had a Rs. 1,000 fixed deposit. Beginning in the early 1950s, the bank then relocated to a space at TDM Hall. Back then, the membership cost four annas. In 1970, the club underwent a major renovation due to the efforts of S. Krishnakumar, the then Ernakulam district Collector and president of the club's executive committee. He began a substantial expansion and modernization programme. The previous structure of the club was demolished, replacing it with its present structure. The number of facilities, rooms, and halls were also increased. In connection with the club's centenary, during the late 1990s, significant changes were made in its structure and facilities. Three small halls were built, the billiards room was air-conditioned, a sports complex with badminton equipment, a table tennis court, and a modern restaurant were added. A new fitness club was also established and air-conditioned rooms and suites were installed.
