= Bloodfire Quest =

2013 fantasy novel by Terry Brooks

- Author: Terry Brooks
- Language: English
- Series: The Dark Legacy of Shannara
- Subject: Shannara
- Genre: Fantasy
- Publisher: Del Rey Books
- Publication date: March 12, 2013
- Publication place: United States
- Media type: Print, audiobook, e-book
- Pages: 368
- ISBN: 9780345523501
- Preceded by: Wards of Faerie
- Followed by: Witch Wraith

Bloodfire Quest is a 2013 fantasy novel by American writer Terry Brooks, the second book of the trilogy The Dark Legacy of Shannara. Released on March 12, 2013 by Del Rey Books, it continues the story of the Elfstones from Wards of Faerie.

== Synopsis ==
The book follows several characters as they try to find a way to overcome the odds against them. Arlingfant has been named as the successor of the Ellcrys, a position that would require complete sacrifice.

== Reception ==
Critical reception has been positive. Publishers Weekly gave a mostly positive review for Bloodfire Quest, praising Brooks's "sorcerous action, skilled characterizations, and rapid-fire storytelling twists". Kirkus Reviews also gave a positive review for the novel while stating that it did have some issues typical for the second novel in a trilogy.
