= Paragons =

Paragons may refer to:

- Paragons (comics), one of the teams of mutants in the comic book series New X-Men: Academy X
- The Paragons, a Jamaican rocksteady band
- The Paragons (Charlotte band), an American 1960s garage rock band
- The Paragons, an American 1950s doo-wop group on Winley Records

== See also ==
- Paragon (disambiguation)
