= Jarka Ruus =

2003 novel by Terry Brooks

- Cover art of Jarka Ruus
- Author: Terry Brooks
- Language: English
- Series: High Druid of Shannara
- Genre: Fantasy
- Publisher: Del Rey Books
- Publication date: 26 August 2003
- Publication place: United States
- Media type: Print (Hardcover)
- Pages: 416
- ISBN: 0-345-43573-7
- OCLC: 52871875
- Dewey Decimal: 813/.54 22
- LC Class: PS3552.R6596 J37 2003
- Preceded by: Morgawr
- Followed by: Tanequil

Jarka Ruus is a fantasy novel by American writer Terry Brooks. It is the first book in the High Druid of Shannara trilogy in Brooks' Shannara series, and takes place 20 years after the events of The Voyage of the Jerle Shannara. It was first published in 2003.

== Plot summary ==
In the 20 years since the events chronicled in The Voyage of the Jerle Shannara, Grianne Ohmsford has become High Druid, or Ard Rhys, of the new Druid Council, but not without misgivings by many over her former life as the evil Ilse Witch. In a bid for power, a group of Druids led by Shadea a'Ru use unorthodox magic called "liquid night" to send Grianne out of the Four Lands and into the Demon-infested world of the Forbidding. Tagwen, Grianne's loyal Dwarf aid, sets out to restore her, seeking the aid of her brother Bek Ohmsford. Finding Bek and his wife Rue Meridian otherwise disposed, Tagwen joins forces with their son Pen, who has a supernatural ability to commune with nature. Advised by the King of the Silver River, they set out in search of the legendary Tanequil tree, which they are told can provide a means to reach Grianne in the Forbidding. They are joined by the elf Ahren Elessedil, now a Druid, and his niece Khyber (heir to the magic Elfstones), as well as the mysteriously empathic Rover girl Cinnaminson, for whom Pen develops strong feelings. Along the way, they are stalked by traitorous Druid minions and their spider-like assassin accomplice, Aphasia Wye. They manage to defeat one of the pursuing Druid airships, but at the cost of Ahren's life and Cinamminson's capture.

Meanwhile, Grianne finds the Forbidding to be a dark mirror of the Four Lands. Exploring this horrific land known locally as Jarka Ruus, she encounters an enigmatic and somewhat annoying creature called Weka Dart. After defeating a dragon like creature and knocking Weka Dart out of a tree, she has a frightening encounter with the shade of Brona, the most legendary evil from the Four Lands, and Grianne is captured by a party of Demons.

== Characters ==
- Ahren Elessedil
- Aphasia Wye
- Brona
- Cinnaminson
- Gar Hatch
- Gerand Cera
- Grianne Ohmsford
- Iridea Eleri
- Kermadec
- Khyber Elessedil
- Pen Ohmsford
- Pyson Wence
- Sen Dunsidan
- Shadea a'Ru
- Tagwen
- Terek Molt
- Traunt Rowan
- Trefen Morys
- Weka Dart
