= Paragon (band) =

German heavy metal band

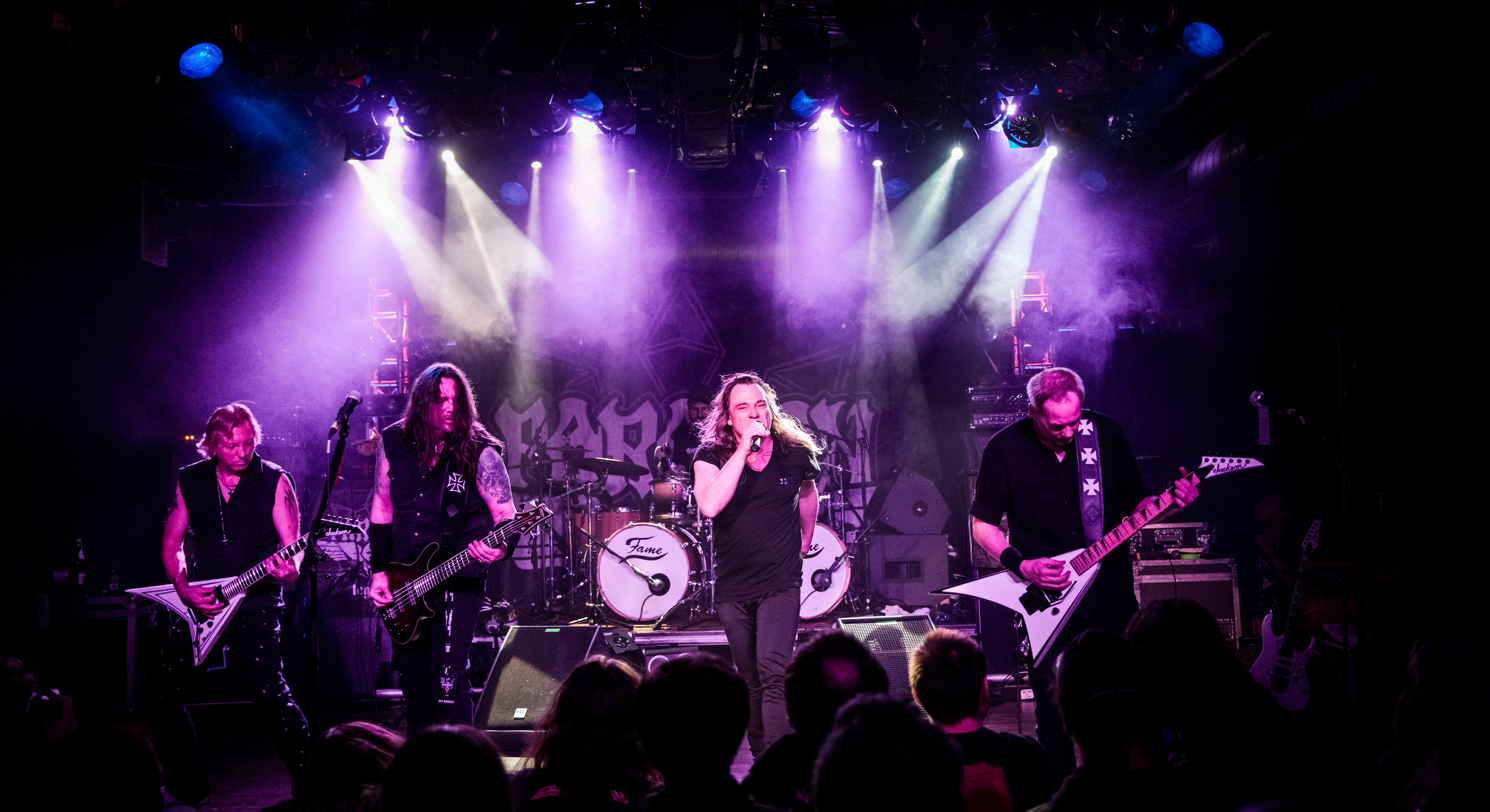
- Paragon performing in 2016

Background information
- Origin: Hamburg, Germany
- Genres: Power metal; heavy metal
- Years active: 1990–present
- Labels: Napalm; Massacre; Remedy
- Members: Andreas Babuschkin; Martin Christian; Jan Bertram; Jan Bünning; Jason Wöbcke
- Past members: See below
- Website: paragon-metal.com
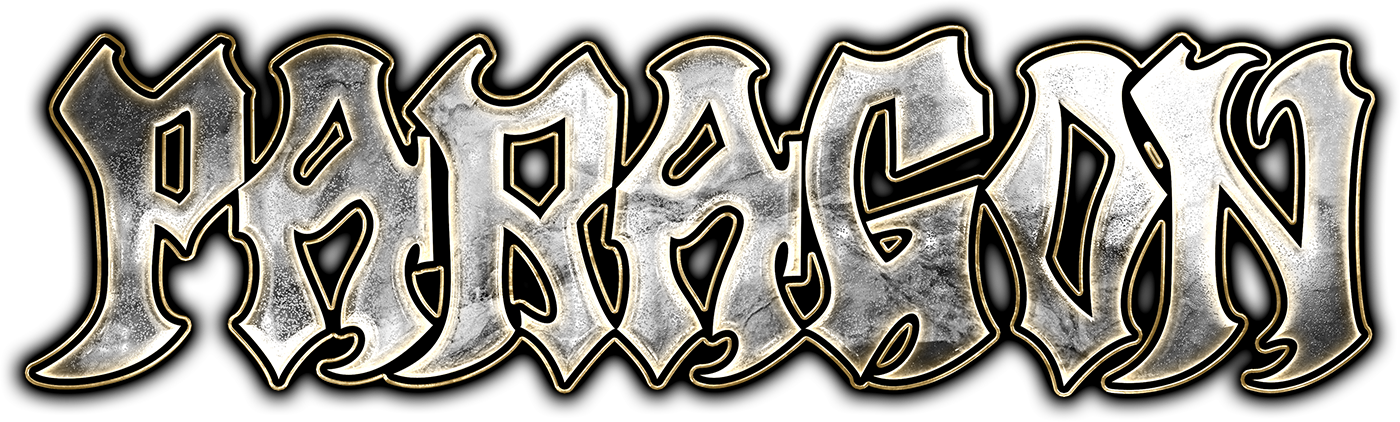

Paragon is a German heavy metal band from Hamburg.

== History ==
Paragon was founded by guitarist Martin Christian (who in many of the band's album booklets is written as Martin Wöbcke when it comes to songwriting-credits). After releasing some demo tapes and a mini-CD, they were able to release an album in 1994, the debut World of Sin. Shortly after this, their record company Blue Merle went bankrupt, and Martin decided to put the band on hiatus.

About two years later, Martin found four new members (Andreas, Jan, Markus, and Claudius) and recorded the album The Final Command. In 1999, Chalice of Steel was released. In 2001, Paragon released Steelbound, engineered and produced by Piet Sielck of Iron Savior. Piet has worked with the band on every album since then.

After the recording of Forgotten Prophecies in early 2007, the band's longtime bass player Jan Bünning quit the band because of "musical differences." Shortly after the band had found a replacement in Dirk Seifert.

In late 2007 the band changed labels to Massacre Records and released Screenslaves in 2008.

In the mid to ending months of 2009, Paragon took a break. During this time they lost two members. Guitarist Günny Kruse who had played on their three studio albums between 2005–2008, and also bassist Dirk Seifert who only played on "Screenslaves".

In 2012 the album "Force Of Destruction" was released.

On 4 November 2014 Paragon announced a new album will be released for the band's 25th anniversary. The album, Hell Beyond Hell came out in 2016.

== Band members ==
Paragon live at Metal Frenzy 2018 in Gardelegen

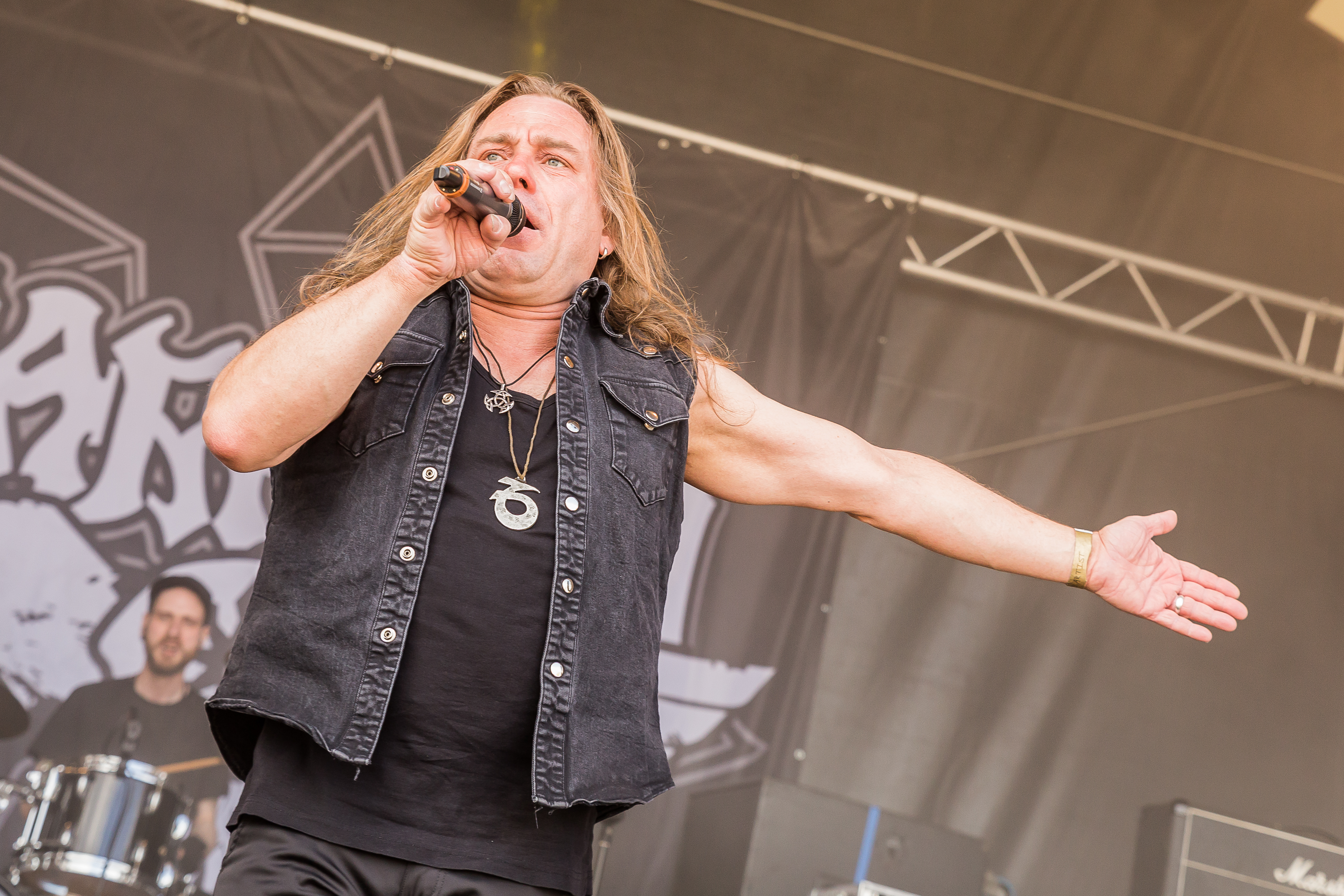
Andreas Babuschkin

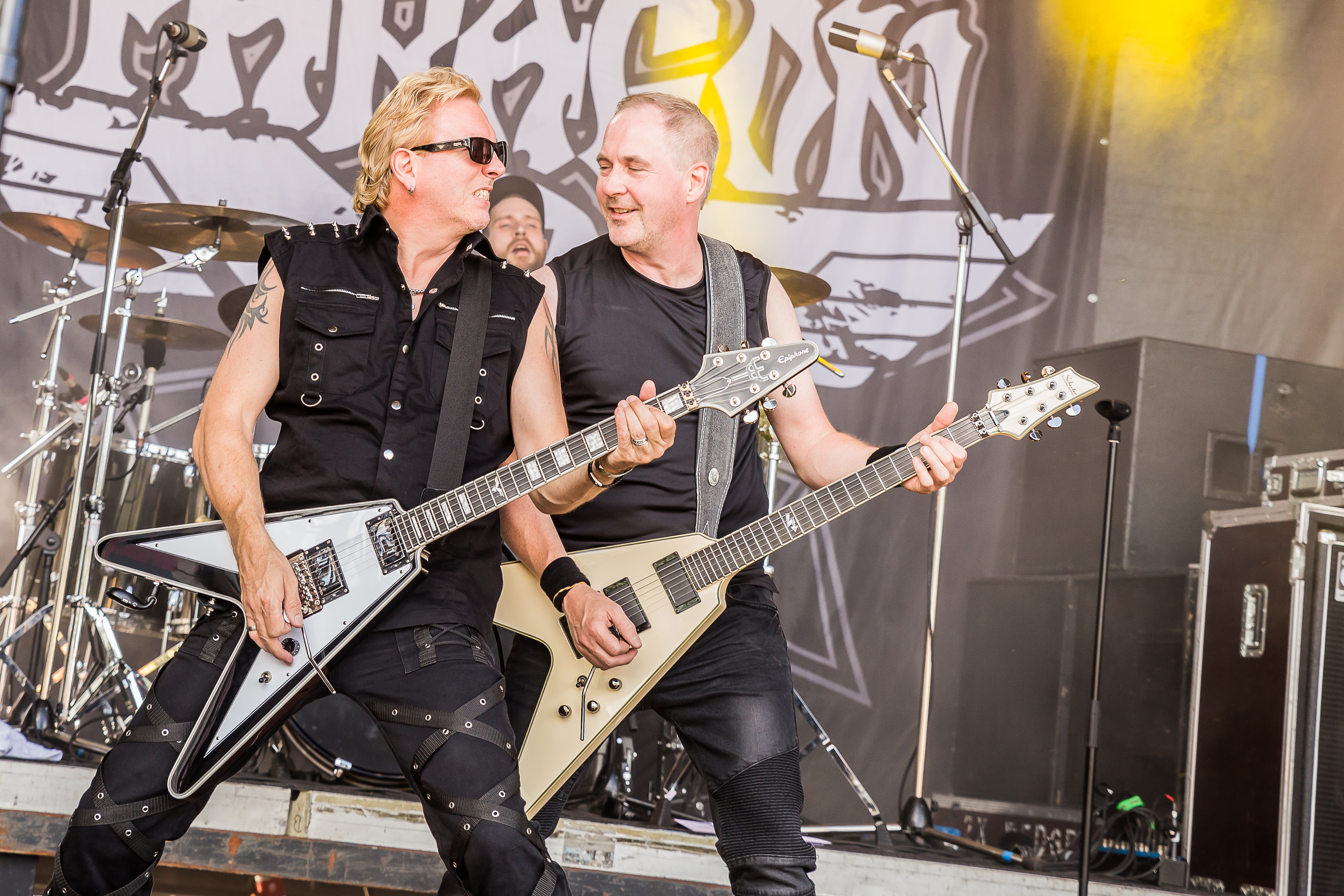
Günther Kruse and Jan Bertram

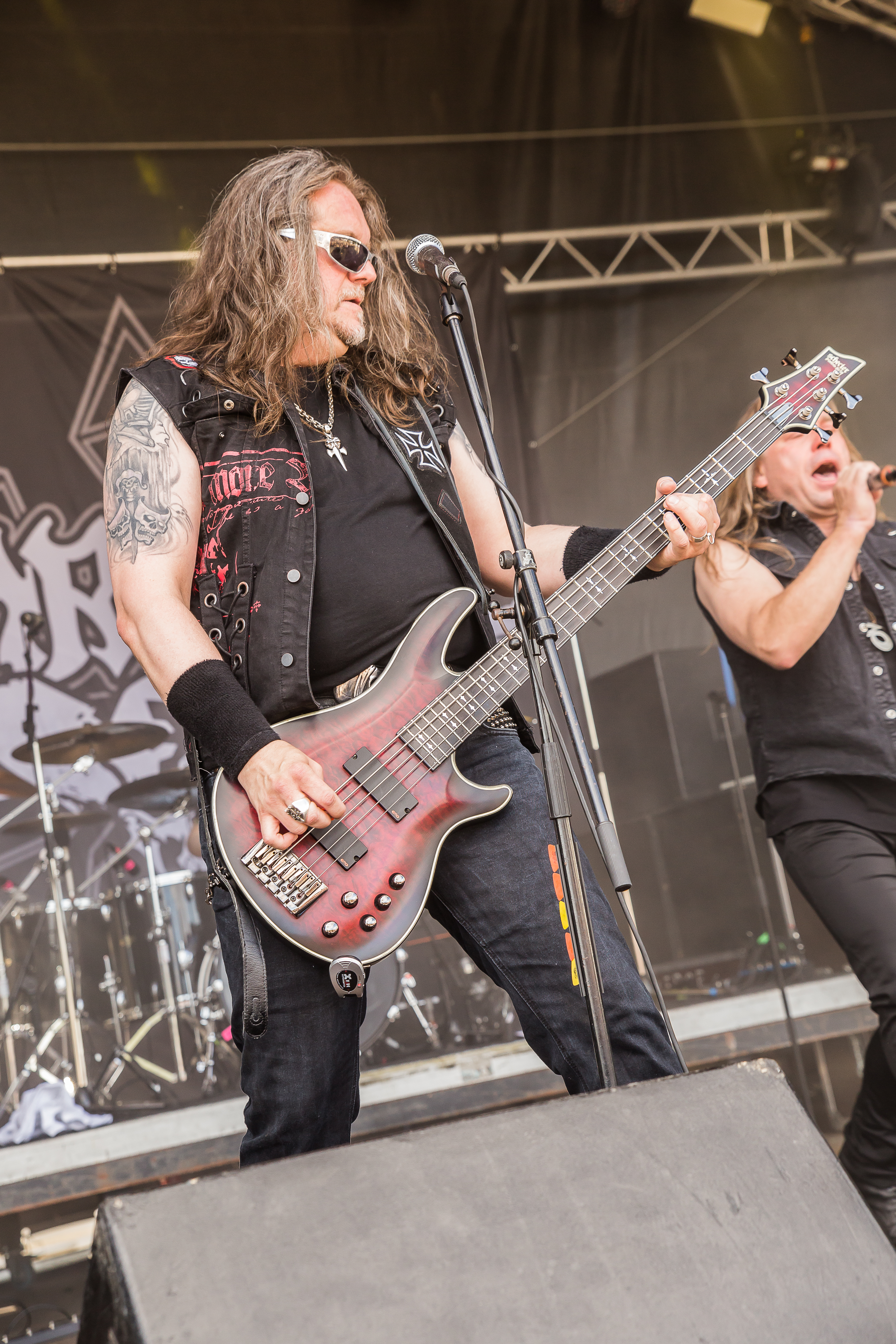
Jan Bünning

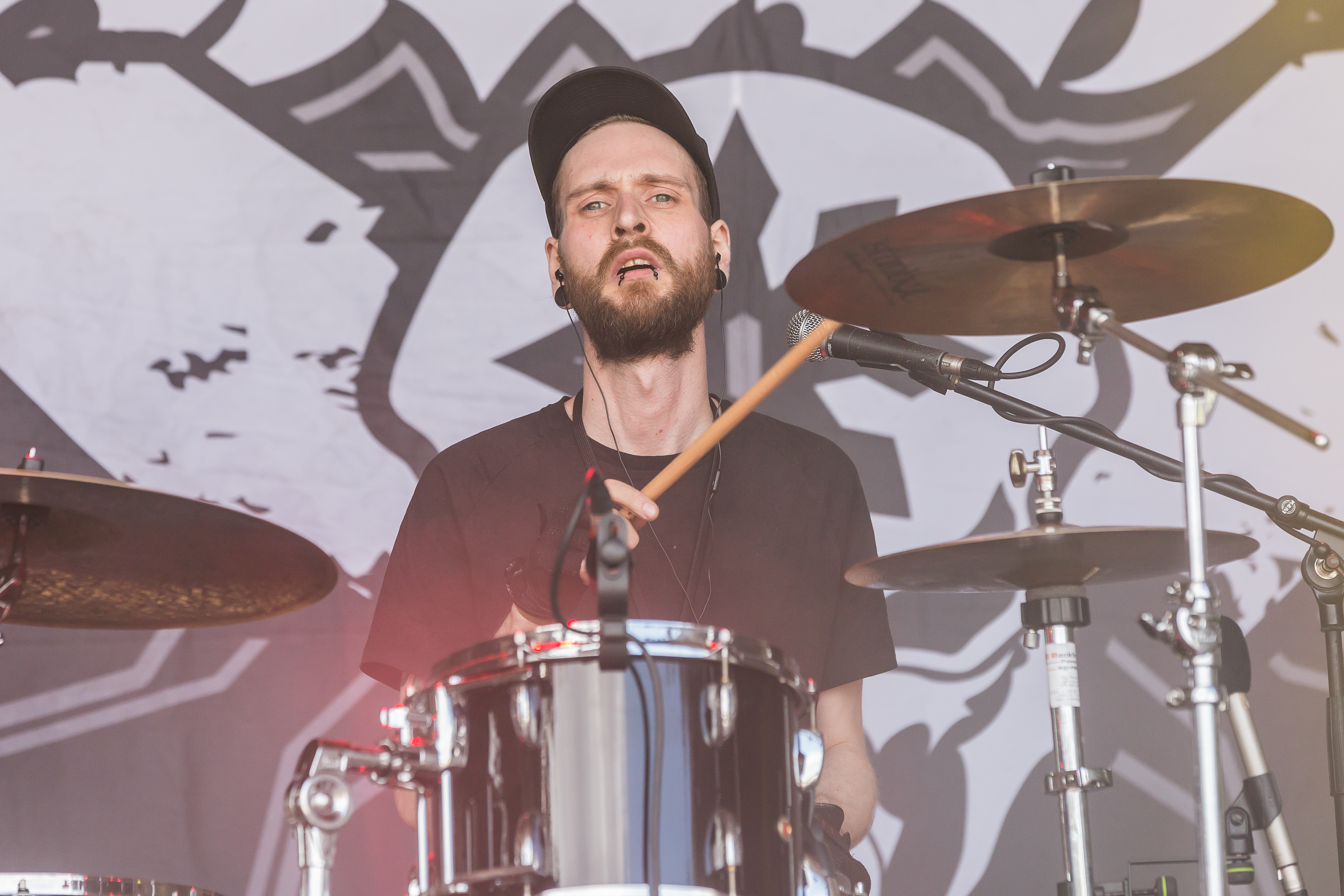
Sören Teckenburg

=== Current members ===
- Andreas Babuschkin – lead vocals (1997–present)
- Martin Christian – guitar, backing vocals (1990–2010, 2015–present)
- Jan Bertram – guitar, backing vocals (2012–present)
- Jan Bünning – bass, backing vocals (1997–2007, 2009–present)
- Jason Wöbcke – drums (2024–present)

=== Former members ===
Vocals:
Chris Barena (1990–1994)
Kay Carstens (1994–1996)

Guitar:
Frank Hellweg (1990–1991)
Marcus Cremer (1991–1993)
Wolfgang "Woko" Köhler (1993–1994)
Daniel Görner (1995–1996)
Claudius Cremer (1996–2003)
Günter Kruse (2003–2009)
Wolfgang Tewes (2010–2015)
David Wieczorek (2010–2012)

Bass:
Dirk Sturzbecher (1990–1995)
Uwe Wessel – bass (1995–1996)
Dirk Seifert (2007–2009)

Drums:
Kay Neuse (1990–1996)
Markus Corby (1996–2005)
Chris Gripp (2005–2013)
Sören Teckenburg – drums (2013–2024)

== Discography ==
=== Albums ===
- World of Sin (1995)
- The Final Command (1998)
- Chalice of Steel (1999)
- Steelbound (2001)
- Law of the Blade (2002)
- The Dark Legacy (2003)
- Revenge (2005)
- Forgotten Prophecies (2007)
- Screenslaves (2008)
- Force of Destruction (2012)
- Hell Beyond Hell (2016)
- Controlled Demolition (2019)
- Metalation (2024)

=== Other releases ===
- Into the Black [EP] (1994)
- 2000 Promo CD [Demo] (2000)
- Eye Of The Storm [Single] (2003)
- Larger Than Life [EP] (2008)

=== Compilation appearances ===
- "Metal Invader" on a Helloween tribute released by Arise Records
- "Two Faced" on "A Tribute to Tankard" (included as a bonus disc on the AFM Records 2007 Tankard release "Best Case Scenario: 25 Years In Beers")
