= The Dark Legacy =

Studio album by Paragon
- Released: 2003
- Recorded: Powerhouse Studios, Hamburg, Germany
- Genre: Heavy metal, power metal
- Label: Remedy Records
- Producer: Piet Sielck

Paragon chronology
Law Of The Blade (2002)	The Dark Legacy (2003)	Revenge (2005)

Professional ratings
Review scores
Source	Rating
Metal Crypt	4.5/5

The Dark Legacy is a studio album by German heavy metal band Paragon, released in 2003.

== Track listing ==
1. "The Legacy" - 5:03
2. "Mirror of Fate" - 5:16
3. "Breaking Glass" - 5:38
4. "Black Hole" - 3:11
5. "Eye of The Storm" - 5:04
6. "Maze of Dread" - 4:25
7. "The Afterlife" - 5:22
8. "Green Hell" - 4:13
9. "Back from Hell" - 3:33
10. "Into The Black" (Digi-Pak version only)
11. "Metal Invaders" - 4:05

== Credits ==
- Andreas Babuschkin - Lead Vocals
- Martin Christian - Guitars / Backing vocals
- Claudius Cremer - Guitars
- Jan Bünning - Bass / Backing vocals
- Markus Corby - Drums

All songs written and arranged by: Christian / Bünning / Corby / Babuschkin,
except "Into The Black" by: Martin Christian and "Metal Invaders" by: Kai Hansen
