= Straken =

2005 novel by Terry Brooks

- Cover art of Straken
- Author: Terry Brooks
- Language: English
- Series: High Druid of Shannara
- Genre: Fantasy
- Publisher: Del Rey Books
- Publication date: 6 September 2005
- Publication place: United States
- Media type: Print (hardback)
- Pages: 384
- ISBN: 0-345-45112-0
- OCLC: 57008256
- Dewey Decimal: 813/.54 22
- LC Class: PS3552.R6596 S77 2005
- Preceded by: Tanequil
- Followed by: Wards of Faerie

Straken is a fantasy novel by American writer Terry Brooks, the third book in his High Druid of Shannara trilogy. First published in 2005, it takes place immediately after the events of Tanequil.

== Plot summary ==
After receiving the darkwand from the Tanequil tree, Pen Ohmsford finds his companions—the Dwarf Tagwen and a small troll force led by Kermadec and his brother Atalan—captured by Druid forces under the command of the illegitimate High Druid Shadea a'Ru. Pen agrees to be taken prisoner in exchange for their release. The elf-girl Khyber Elessedil, however, manages to stow away on the Druid airship before it leaves for Paranor.

Meanwhile, Trefen Morys and Bellizen, Druids still loyal to the banished Ard Rhys, help spring Bek and Rue from Paranor's dungeons. After barely escaping with their lives, Bek is directed in a dream by the King of the Silver River to seek Pen's abandoned friends in Taupo Rough. He is told that Pen has made it into the Forbidding in order to save Grianne Ohmsford (the banished High Druid) and Bek will have to work together with each of Pen's companions to ensure their safe return. In a daring airship rescue, Bek and company save the Trolls and Tagwen from a marauding flood of wraithlike Urdas and return to Paranor, picking up a new army of Kermadec's Trolls along the way.

Pen is imprisoned in Paranor and the darkwand is confiscated. Khyber soon springs him free, and together they make their way up to the High Druid's sleeping quarters, where the darkwand is secured. Pen grabs the darkwand and is transported to the realm of the Forbidding, while Khyber is taken prisoner and sentenced to death.

On the Prekkendoran Plains, Pied Sanderling, Captain of the Elven Home Guard, successfully rallies the remaining Elven army to repel the advancing Federation forces and take refuge in a besieged Free-born camp. He leads a daring raid on the Federation base and manages to destroy the Dechtera, the airship that bears a devastating crystal-powered fire-launching weapon prototype. Unshaken, Prime Minister of the Federation Sen Dunsidan commissions the building of another such weapon, but continues to refuse the advice of his vizier Iridia, who wants him to attack Arborlon, the Elven capital. He finds out too late that Iridia is a Moric, a changeling Demon who escaped from the Forbidding when Grianne Ohmsford was banished, and is killed along with the weapon engineer Etan Orek. Taking the Prime Minister's form, the Moric takes the newly created weapon upon the airship Zolomach towards Arborlon, with the intent of destroying the Ellcrys tree-the only barrier keeping the armies of Demons from the Forbidding from flooding the Four Lands.

Grianne Ohmsford, meanwhile, escapes the stronghold of the Straken Lord with the help of the Straken Lord's turncoat minion Weka Dart, promising him that she will take him back to the Four Lands if at all possible. They are chased through the tunnels under the fortress by a huge worm-like Graumth, and in a final stand, Grianne unleashes a powerfully destructive Wishsong that reminds her of her former life as the evil Ilse Witch, although the Wishsong had never before been this powerful or irrepressible. She speculates that her recent forced psychological transformation into a Fury may have awoken this frightening power in her. Escaping the catacombs, Grianne and Weka Dart are found by Pen, who has been guided to her location by the darkwand. Pen, too, has discovered magic within him, magic more powerful than the simple animal communication skills that he had been previously blessed with. Having survived several encounters with a massive dragon, Pen found that the darkwand had awoken in him the magic of the Wishsong, the magic that both his father and his aunt possess, and that it has not fully revealed itself even yet. Together, Pen, Grianne, and Weka Dart travel back to the place where they can use the darkwand to return to the Four Lands. Unfortunately, Grianne is forced to tell Weka Dart that it is unlikely that the darkwand will be able bring Weka back as well, sending him into a frenzy. After being explained to about the world that Grianne is returning to, he decided not to go to the world after all. He leaves in the middle of the night, never to be seen again. Pen and Grianne prepare to transport back to Paranor.

Having returned to Paranor to help Pen and Grianne when they return, Bek, Rue, and Tagwen sneak in through a tunnel of Tagwen's finding, while Kermadec and his Troll army besiege the keep. Using a secret passage to the Ard Rhys' chambers, they discover Khyber, who escaped her executioners, hiding in the shadows. They find that Shadea a'Ru and her followers have set an inescapable magic trap, called a triagenel, in the chamber to incapacitate Grianne should she return from the Forbidding. Through the combined powers of Bek's Wishsong and Khyber's elfstones, the two manage to weaken the triagenel so that Grianne will be able to break free when it collapses upon her and Pen. Pen and Grianne return to Paranor and, after the triagenel is sprung, Grianne unleashes the power of her Wishsong upon it. This not only utterly destroys the triagenel, but also obliterates one of the walls of the room. Grianne sends Pen with his family and Khyber to find the Moric, while she confronts Shadea, Traunt, and Pyson herself. Reinforced at the last minute by Kermadec and his brother Atalan, Grianne defeats Shadea and her followers and retakes her rightful name as Ard Rhys.

Aboard the airship Swift Sure, Khyber uses the Elfstones to discover that the Moric has taken the form of Sen Dunsidan and is headed for Arborlon. They catch up to him, and under the guise of a diplomatic meeting, trick him into taking the darkwand which transports both the Moric and the darkwand back into the Forbidding. The Moric is then presumably devoured by Pen's giant dragon.

Finally, Grianne, having negotiated an arms treaty calling for the elimination of all crystal-based weapons research, retires as Ard Rhys. She travels with Pen to try to save Pen's girlfriend Cinnaminson, who was transformed into an Aeriad spirit of the Tanequil tree. She is able to, but only by taking the Rover girl's place as an Aeriad. As a spirit, she lives unfettered by both her guilt over her history as the Ilse Witch and her fear of evil awakening in her, and thus finds freedom.

== Characters ==
The major characters are:

- Aphasia Wye
- Atalan
- Bellizen
- Cinnaminson
- Etan Orek
- Grianne Ohmsford
- Kermadec
- Kellen Elessedil
- Khyber Elessedil
- Moric
- Pen Ohmsford
- Pied Sanderling
- Tael Riverine
- Sen Dunsidan
- Shadea a'Ru
- Tagwen
- Traunt Rowan
- Trefen Morys
- Weka Dart
