= Paragon, Nebraska =

- Abandoned community
- Location within the state of Nebraska
- Coordinates: 42°39′20″N 97°11′08″W
- Country: United States
- State: Nebraska
- County: Cedar

Population (2000)
  - Total: 0
- Time zone: UTC-6 (Central (CST))
  - Summer (DST): UTC-5 (CDT)
- Area code: 402

Paragon is a former community that was located in Cedar County, NE about 4.5 miles northeast of Hartington, NE. It was called a community because its cemetery, school, mill, post office and store were located within a radius of about one mile of one another. The Paragon Cemetery is the only part of the community remaining today.

== History ==
The first settler, Albert Erdenberger, homesteaded here in May 1867. The Anderson, Bottolfsen and Olsen families joined the Erdenbergers in May 1869 with others following soon after. The Paragon community was first called ‘Smithland’ after Michael Smith, the initial postmaster in the area. That post office (P.O.), established December 1871, was in the NE quarter of Section 31 on the north side of the Main Bow Creek just east of present-day Hartington. In 1881 the Smithland P.O. was moved to about ¼ mile north of Paragon Mills, which had been built in Sections 28 and 29 along the Bow Creek in 1879. The Smithland P.O. was renamed Paragon February 15, 1882. In October 1883 the Paragon P.O. was moved to the newly formed village of Hartington. At about the time Paragon Mills was built, Smithland changed its name, first to Paragon City then, on February 15, 1882, to Paragon. In 1883 Paragon was described by visitors from Dakota County as “a small cluster of houses situated in the Bow Valley. The principal building is a mill, a large and valuable establishment, having an unfailing water power, and doing large business.” The large grist mill operated until about 1906 and was dismantled around 1909. Its GPS coordinates are estimated to have been 42°38'00”N 97°12'37"W.

Paragon Lutheran Church, built in 1904, evolved from the Bow Valley Norwegian Evangelical Lutheran Church established in 1873. Services had been conducted in homes, the school, and Hartington until 1904. Paragon Lutheran was located ¼ mile south of the cemetery. It closed in 1944 and the building was sold and moved to Hartington in 1953. Paragon Cemetery, established in 1876, is a Nebraska State Historical Society site today. Early pioneers buried in the Paragon community are commemorated by unique round iron markers having a moldboard plow picture. Paragon School (District 24) was located about 1 mile southeast of the cemetery. It was organized February 24, 1875. Smithland School District (No. 104), organized February 15, 1913, was dissolved and merged with Paragon District 24 in May 1959. The Paragon District then merged with Hartington District 8 in 1968.
