= Paragon Restaurant =

Indian restaurant

Paragon Group restaurants
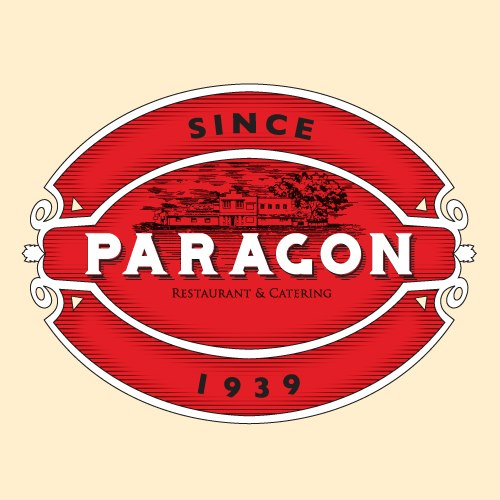
- Type: Private
- Industry: Restaurant and Catering
- Genre: Casual Dining
- Founded: Calicut, Kerala (1939)
- Founder: Govindan Panchkail
- Headquarters: Kannur Road, Calicut, Kerala, India.
- Area served: India, UAE
- Key people: Sumesh Govind (Chairman, President and CEO)
- Services: Asian Cuisine
- Website: paragonrestaurant.net

Paragon restaurant is an Indian restaurant known for the variety of Malabar cuisines in Kerala and Middle East. It was founded in 1939 by Govindan Panhikeyil in Calicut, Kerala.

== History ==
Paragon was established in Kozhikkode by Govindan Panhikeyil in 1939. According to Travel + Leisure, Govindan was a government official working for the Indian Railways. It initially served "mapila" cuisines before opening up its menu. It opened its first store in Dubai, the United Arab Emirates in 2005, followed by another one in 2013.

== Recognition ==
Paragon has received praise from celebrity chefs like Silvena Rowe and Vineet Bhatia.

In 2023, TasteAtlas ranked Paragon's Kozhikkode outlet at #111 on its list of the 150 Most Legendary Restaurants list.
