= Ernakulam Shiva Temple =

- Ernakulathappan Temple
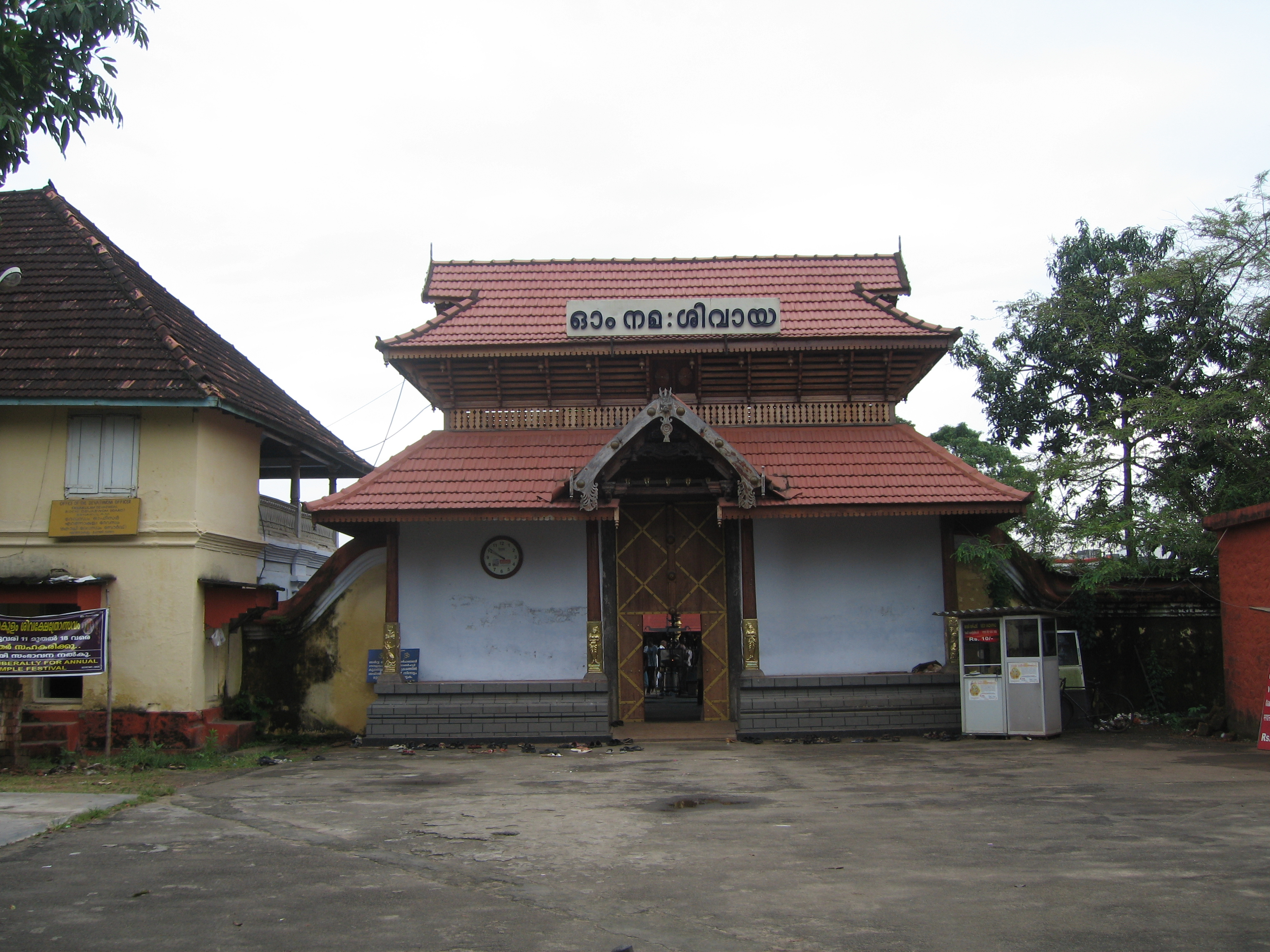
- The West Gopuram

- Location in Kerala

Religion
- Affiliation: Hinduism
- District: Ernakulam
- Deity: Lord Shiva
- Festivals: Annual Festival in the month of Makaram (Malayalam Calendar); Shivaratri
- Governing body: Cochin Devaswom Board

Location
- Location: Ernakulam
- State: Kerala
- Country: India
- Coordinates: 9°58′6.7″N 76°16′56.8″E

Architecture
- Type: Traditional Kerala Temple

Website
- https://www.eranakulamsivatemple.org/

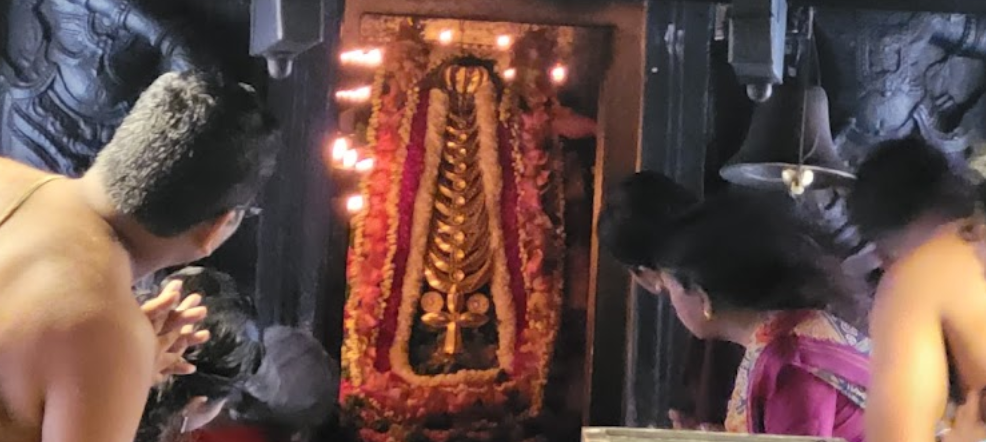
Rishinagakulathappan aka ernakulathappan

Ernakulam Shiva Temple, also known as Ernakulathappan Temple, is one of the major temples of Kerala, located in heart of Ernakulam, Kochi, Kerala, India. The temple, dedicated to Lord Shiva, is considered as the city temple, with the presiding deity as the protector of the city, as per local Hindu faiths and traditions. As per the common practice in Kerala, the deity is reverently called Ernakulathappan, which means Lord of Ernakulam. The temple is located within the Durbar Hall Ground. The temple history itself has deep association with history of the city and was one of the 7 royal temples of Kochi Maharajas. The temple is now under administration of Cochin Devaswam Board. The temple in its current form was built under active patronage of Diwan Sri Edakkunni Sankara Warrier in year 1846 and raised it level of a Royal temple in the Kochi Kingdom. The temple is built on 1-acre (4,000 m^{2}) land. The temple is one of the major Shiva temples in Kerala counted along with the Ettumanoor Mahadevar Temple, Kaduthruthy Mahadeva Temple, Vaikom Temple, Chengannur Mahadeva Temple, Vadakkunathan temple, and Sreekanteswaram Mahadeva Temple, Thiruvananthapuram.

== Legend ==
Cheranalloor Kartha Family of South Chittor was the founder of Ernakulam Siva Temple. As per the devaprasna this temple have a connection with Vaishnava. Jadavedan nampoothiri was the swamiyar of Ernakulam Siva Temple and Thiruvananthapuram Shri Padmanabhaswamy Temple. He was a member of Cheranalloor Kartha Family of South Chittoor

The temple's legend is deeply associated with Hindu epic Mahabharata. Arjuna, the 3rd Pandava made a severe penance to propitiate Lord Shiva. Pleased with Arjuna’s devotion Shiva accompanied with his consort Sri Parvathi set out from their abode at Mount Kailash to meet Arjuna.

Shiva intends to impress Parvathi with the devotion Arjuna has towards him. Shiva disguises himself as "Kiratha" a tribal hunter before appearing before Arjuna.Just as Shiva appears before Arjuna he sees a wild boar charging towards Arjuna and shoots an arrow at the boar. Arjuna, who is an accomplished archer, also shoots an arrow at the boar. The boar who was in fact a demon named Mookasura in disguise is killed and its original form is revealed. However, dispute arises between Arjuna and Kiratha as to who is the real killer of the animal. A battle ensues between the two, lasting a long time, ultimately resulting in Kiratha’s victory over Arjuna.

The vanquished Arjuna, unable to even stand up makes a Shiva Linga out of mud and performs a pooja offering flowers. To his surprise, he sees that the flower he offers over the Shiva Linga is falling over the head of Kiratha. Arjuna then realises that Kiratha is none other than his Lord Shiva. Pleased with his devotion and sincerity, Lord Shiva granted Pashupatha Arrow to Arjuna. Arjuna left this place and soon this area was covered with dense forest, uninhabited for long time. The existence of the Shiva linga made by Arjuna also disappeared from memories of all.

Centuries later, a boy named Devala who has been cursed by a sage, now has a body of a snake, crawled into this forest and saw this lingam completely submerged into mud . He worshiped this lingam as part a deep penance in hope for redeeming from the curse. Soon a few people spotted this mysterious man with body of snake and called him as Rishi Nagam (Saint Serpent) and feared even to come near to him. Some even tried to thwart him with sticks etc. Unmoved by all these action, Rishi Nagam continued his severe penance. Finally Lord Shiva and Parvathi appeared in their original form and asked the sage to take a dip in the nearby pond. As soon as he immersed, he was redeemed from the curse. Soon a new idol appeared just near to the original lingam. Based on this legend, the place got its new name, Rishnagakulam (The pond of Rishi Nagam) and the temple was constructed by the public.

== History ==
The existence of temple was first mentioned in Sangam Literature as one of the major temples under Chera Dynasty. Cheras were adherent worshipers of Lord Shiva. When Chera dynasty ended, the place fell into the hands a few Nair nobles who renamed the place as Ernakulam (corrupt form of original word- Eere Naal Kulam meaning Pond with water always) in recognition of the famous sacred pond of this temple. Soon this area came under reign of Kochi Kingdom. The Kochi Rulers, due to the siege of Fort Kochi by the Dutch in the 17th century, moved their capital to Ernakulam and established a Palace close to this temple, facing the temple pond (The Tank Shed Palace seen behind current Durbar Hall). This helped the temple to gain prominence, due to royal patronage. The temple deity was declared as protector of Ernakulam city (Nagara Devata),

The second phase of the temple came in 1842 when Diwan of Kochi, Sri Edakkunni Sankara Warrier felt to renovate the temple which were in dilapidated condition. Works were started in 1843. Two new Gopura Mandapams (Entrance Towers) were constructed in traditional Kerala style similar to Sree Poornathrayesa Temple of Tripunithura which was the Chief Royal temple of Kochi Maharajas. The new temple complex was opened to public in 1846. The temple was elevated to a royal temple and brought under direct administration of Kochi Government's Devaswom Board. In 1949, when Kochi acceded into India Union, the Devaswom Board came under new Government's control, which still remains.

== Deities ==
The presiding deity of the temple is Shiva in Gourisankara form, located in main sanctum sanctorum, facing west towards the Arabian sea. The Lingam in the main sanctum sanctorum is considered to be Swayambhu (Divinely derived). On the northern side of the main sanctum sanctorum, there is the small shrine of Kirthamoorthy which is believed to the original Lingam worshipped by Arjuna. On the southern side, there is a small shrine for Shiva's son Ganesha. There is a small area behind the main sanctum sanctorum, considered as the shrine of Shiva's consort Parvati, hence the east gate is known as the Devi Gate. Outside the Inner temple circle, Ayyappa and Nagaraja are worshipped in shrines.

== Structure ==
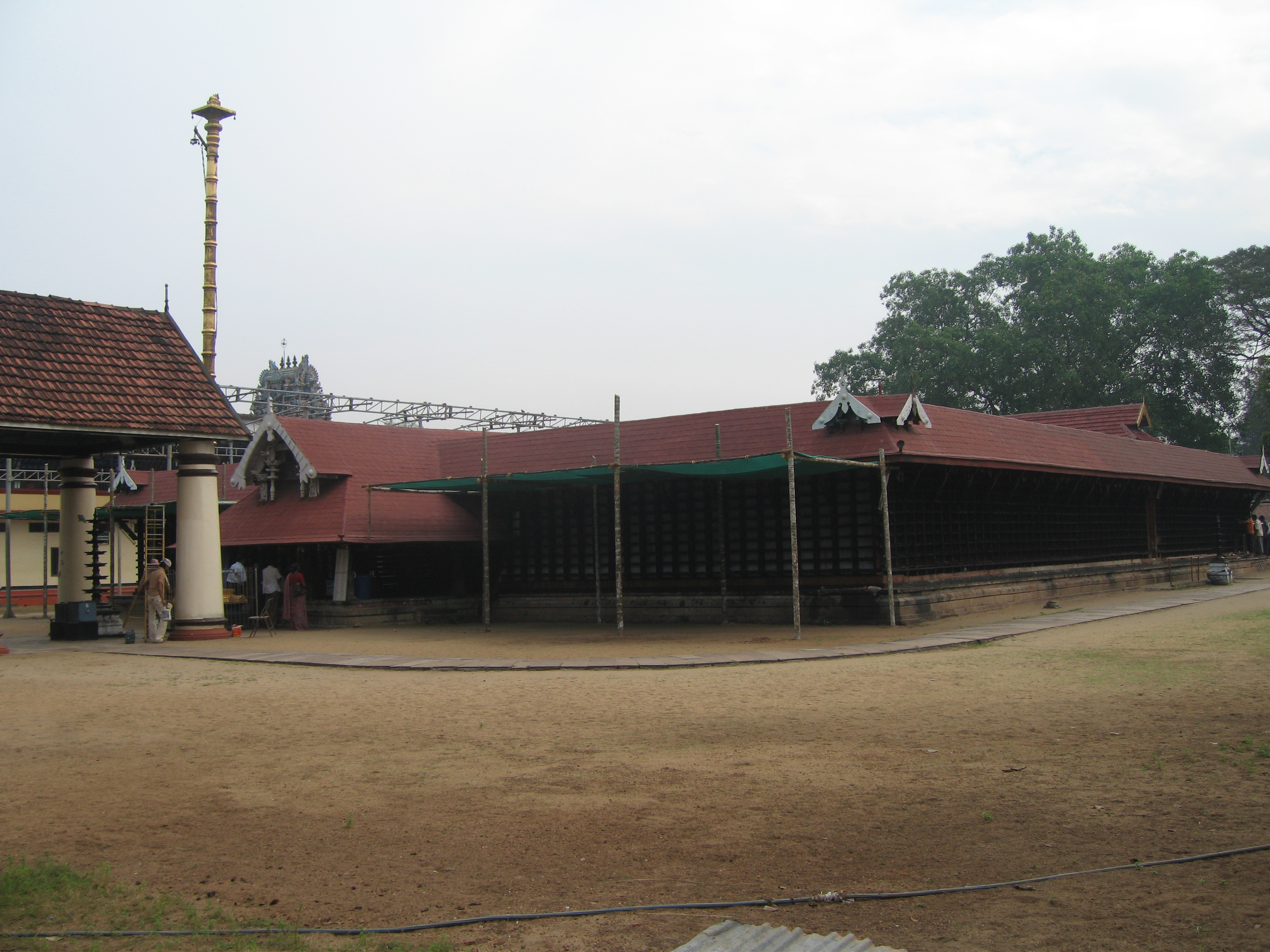
The temple is an example of Kerala temple architecture

The entire temple is located in 1.2-acre (4,900 m^{2}) land. The temple is built in typical Kerala temple architecture. The Sanctum complex is circular with fine sculpted walls. The roof is covered with copper tiles. The temple has two gates, the western Gopuram is a two storied structure in typical Kerala architecture with gabled roofs and slanting windows. The eastern gopuram is recently renovated similar to the western side. The Devaswom office is located near the western Gopuram. Recently a new marriage hall and Oottupura (dining hall) is constructed at the northern side.

== The temple complex ==
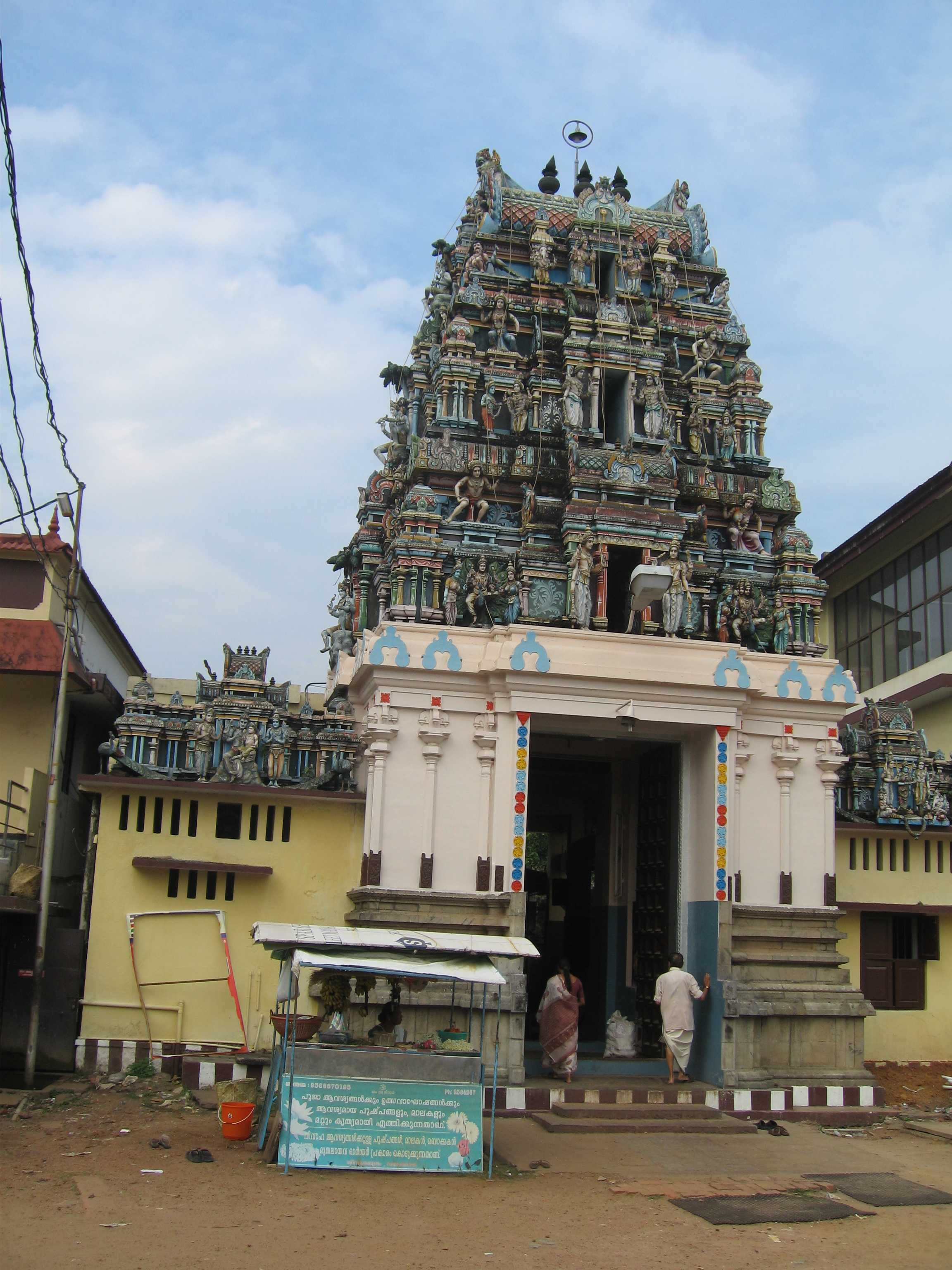
The Murugan temple is built in Tamil style

Adjacent to the main Shiva Temple, two other temples are constructed in the temple grounds, which makes the Ernakulam Temple Complex. On the Northern side, a Murugan Kovil built in Tamil style can be seen. It was constructed by Tamil residents of Kochi during the administration of Diwan Venkataswamy who was a Tamil Brahmin. The Muruga Kovil is managed by Tamil Brahmin Association of Ernakulam and all rituals in this temple are in accordance to Tamil style. The presiding deity is Lord Muruga with his consorts Valli and Devanyani. There are two separate shrines for Navagrahas and Ganesha, apart from regular poojas for Vishnu, Dakshinamoorthy and Durga Devi.

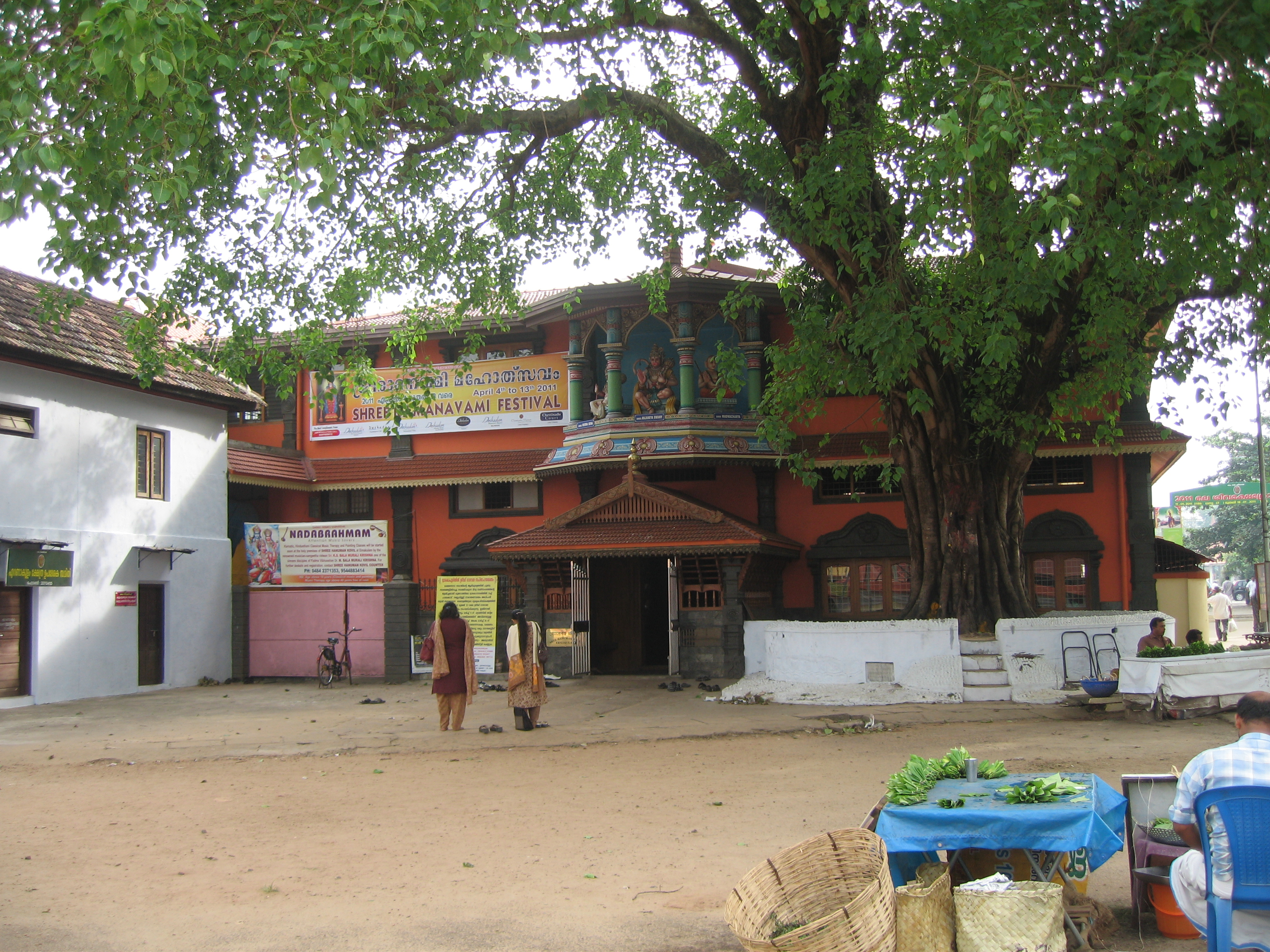
The Hanuman temple is built in Udupi Madhwa Sampradaya style

On the eastern side, a Hanuman temple built in Kannadiga Udupi style can be seen. It was constructed by Diwan Venkat Rao aka Venkata Rayar, a Madhva Brahmin, in year 1850. Based on a vision he had in his dream, an ancient idol was excavated near the holy pond and the current Sree Hanuman Kovil was built in traditional Udupi Madhwa Sampradaya style. The presiding deity, Lord Hanuman faces the Shiva temple on western side with a small idol of Lord Rama in main sanctum sanctorum. Apart from this, shrines for lord Nagaraja and Raghavendra Swami are also worshipped. The present Ernakulathappan Temple complex consists of these three temples, which exist together without any interference in others' customs. This also shows a mini version of South India, excluding Telugu culture.

Apart from the temples, the famous Ernakulam Temple pond is located in eastern side, facing opposite to Murugan temple. There is also offices of Ernakulam Brahmin Association and its marriage hall apart from offices of Temple advisory committee. A 200-year-old banyan tree can be seen near to Hanuman temple.

== Pooja Timings ==
Nadathurakal Time	3.30 AM
Nirmalyam	3.30 AM
Abishekam	4.00 to 4.45 AM
Shankhabhishekam	5.15 AM
Ushapooja Nadathurakal	5.45 AM
Yethertha Pooja Nadathurakal	6.15 AM
Ethirtha Sheeveli	6.30 AM
Pantheeradi Pooja	7.30 to 8.15 AM
Uchcha Pooja	9.30 to 11AM
Vykunneram Nadathruakal	4.00 PM
Deeparadhana	According to sunset
Athaazhapooja Nadathurakal	7.30 PM
Thripuka Nadathurakal	8.00 PM

== Festivals ==
The Uthsavom (temple festival) of Shiva temple is one of the grandest festivals in the Kochi city, normally celebrated during Makaram month. The festivities starts with Kodiyettam (hoisting of the temple flag ) on the first day evening. On the seventh day there is Pakalpooram, when the deity is being taken out in procession with caparisoned elephants with Panchavadyam and finally terminating at Durbar Hall Ground after the famous Pandimelam and colourful fire works. On the final day around evening, in a solemn ceremony the flag is lowered and the deity is then taken for the Arattu ( holy bath ) in the nearby temple tank. After that starts the famous Arattu procession with the accompaniment of Panchavadyam. The procession terminates at Durbar Hall Ground. The grand fireworks then bring the curtain down to this week long festival. During all these days Sheeveli is arranged inside the temple and the best available Chendamelam artists are arranged for this. Special poojas connected with the festival are conducted everyday by famous priests from Chennose and Puliyannur Mana. A variety of cultural programmes are also arranged during these days. Special emphasis is given to promote temple arts like Ottamthullal, Paatakam, Thayambaka, Kathakali, Classical dances, Classical music concerts, Bhajans etc. Annadanam is also arranged. Thousands of people throng the temple to witness these programmes. Watching the Pakalpooram and Arattu processions will be an unforgettable experience for anybody. The adjacent Durbar Hall ground becomes a beehive of activities during the Uthsavom.

Along with this, Maha Shivratri in the month of Kumbham, Thiruvathira in the month of Dhanu, Pradosham, Mondays, etc. are also celebrated in a grand manner.

== See also ==
- Temples of Kerala
