= Durbar Hall Ground =

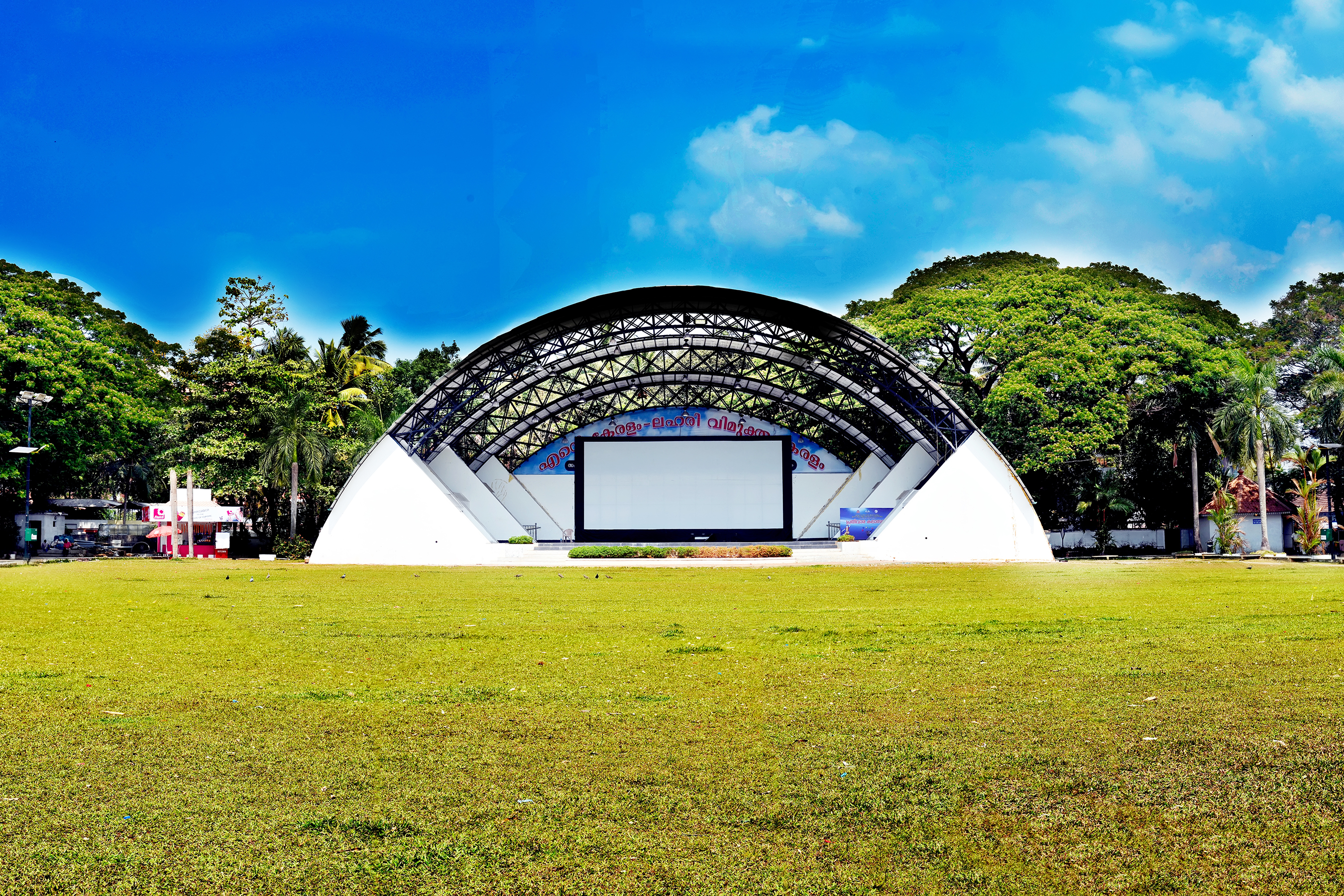
- A view of Durbar Hall Ground
- Location: (India) Kochi
- Notable landmarks: Durbar Hall Ground
- Governing authority: Maharajah of Cochin

The Durbar Hall Ground is a popular location for various cultural activities in the city of Kochi, Kerala, India. The compound of the ground also has the Durbar Hall, which now functions mostly as an art gallery. The ground itself is used for various cultural programmes of interest to the general public.

== History ==
Most of the details of this section have been obtained from

The Durbar Hall Ground has been witness to great moments in the history of Kochi. This 2-acre (8,100 m^{2}) property, once owned by the Maharajah of Cochin, was the venue for some glittering events. It was here that the Maharajah held his durbar. In fact, the durbar was held at the present day building, which houses the Durbar Hall Art Gallery, with the public gathering at the spacious ground. Some of the significant proclamations, like the administrative reforms of 4 January 1938, the new constitution of the Cochin State of 17 June 1938, and the formation of the Cochin State Central War Committee on 28 June 1940, were all made at this very ground.

During those early days this ground was used for exhibitions, football games, regular military parades and for the processions taken out in connection with the Ernakulam Shiva Temple festival. This ground and the path leading from it to the temple nearby, was out of bounds to those of the lower rungs of the society. A change in this law came about only after the Temple Entry Declaration.

It was at the Kulapuramalika that stands at one end of this ground, that Appan Thampuran and Kunjukuttan Thampuran launched `Rasikaranjini,' the famous literary magazine. And it was here during World War II, that the war committee organised a spectacular war exhibition that was considered one of the finest spectacles of the time.

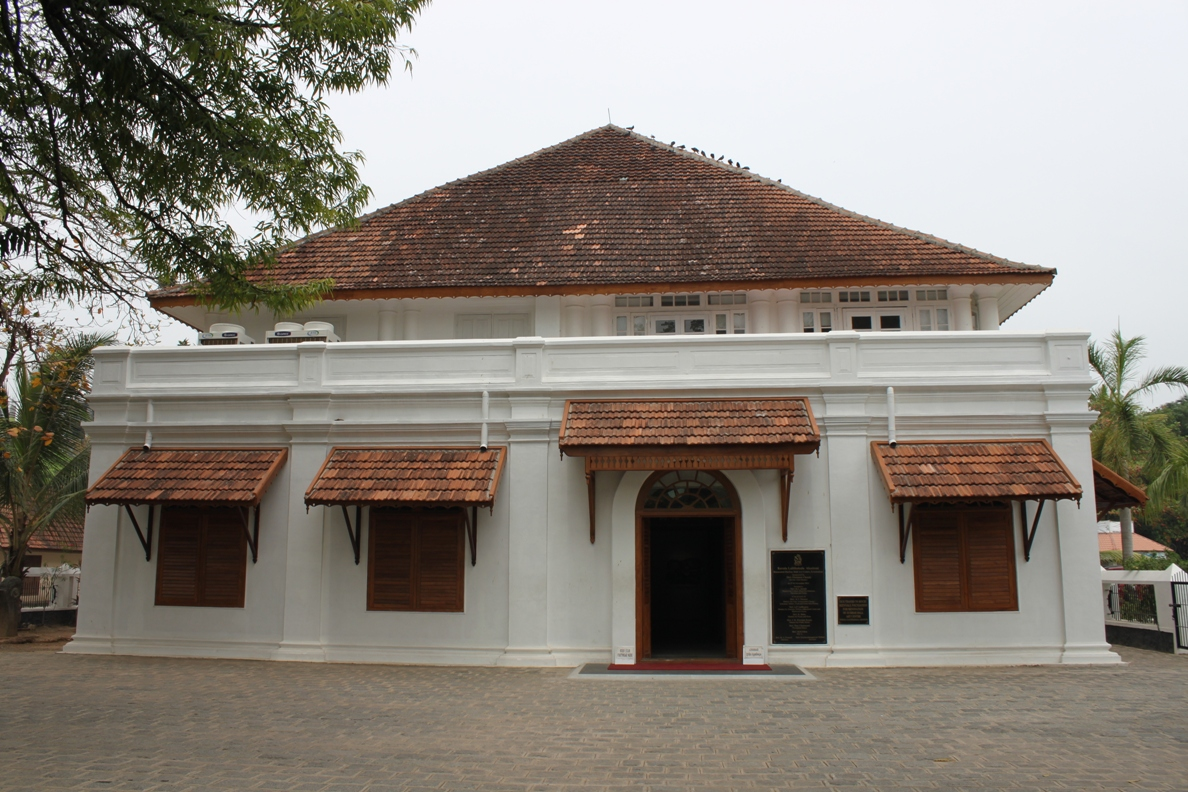
Kerala Lalithakala Academy Durbar Hall Art Centre adjacent to the ground

Almost half of the ground was used for the construction of residential quarters for District collector and for official residences of Judges of Kerala High Court. The present day ground is just half of the original size after these encroachments including for widening Durbar Hall Road and creating Parking space for Rama varma Club. The ground also lost its aestheticism due to renovation by demolishing old band house and new un aesthetic construction including creating parking space inside the ground.

Old timers still remember some of the football matches played at this venue like the ones between the local Town Club and the British army men. For a long time this was the main venue for cricket matches too. The small band shed at the North East end of the ground served as a pavilion and the dwarf walls around the ground were packed with supporters of the sides. Widening of the road near the Rama Varma Club reduced the size of the ground considerably, forcing the organisers to seek a new venue for these very popular fixtures. This ground was home to the Swantons Cricket Club for long till the recent renovation of the place forced them to seek a new home.

For a long while this ground remained neglected and served as a dump yard of sorts. The ground, now owned by the Revenue Department, was spruced up giving it a lush green look, new sparkling walkways and everything to serve as a leisure spot. With an investment of Rs. 49.94 lakhs, the District Tourist Promotion Council undertook the restoration and beautification work.

An open-air auditorium, the band stand, light towers to ensure proper lighting, pay and park facilities have all gone to give this ground a facelift.

== Location ==
The Durbar Hall Ground is located on the Durbar Hall Road (9°58′7.4″N 76°17′3.0″E), which is perpendicular to, and cuts the Park Avenue Road, MG Road and Chittoor Road. It has two entrances, one opposite the TDM Hall, and another on the northern side opposite the Rama Varma Club.

== 2002 Beautification of the Ground ==
Most of the details of this section have been taken from, and

Until 2002, the ground was primarily used as a dumping yard or sorts, including things like civic waste and garbage. Further, it had a cricket pitch which was extensively used for practice by the local Swanton's Cricket Club. In 2002, the Ernakulam District Tourism Promotion Council launched the beautification programme at a cost of around 50 lakh INR. The beautification programme led to a very new look for the ground, which now boasts of a very green lawn, a walkway, a parking lot, an open-air stage with state-of-the-art facilities and huge light towers.

The Durbar Hall, which was in ruins in the mid-1990s was also subjected to a beautification, which gave it a magnificent new look. The Durbar Hall beautification was carried out in the 1998-1999 time frame.
