= Broadway, Kochi =

Shopping street in Kerala, India

Broadway, Ernakulam
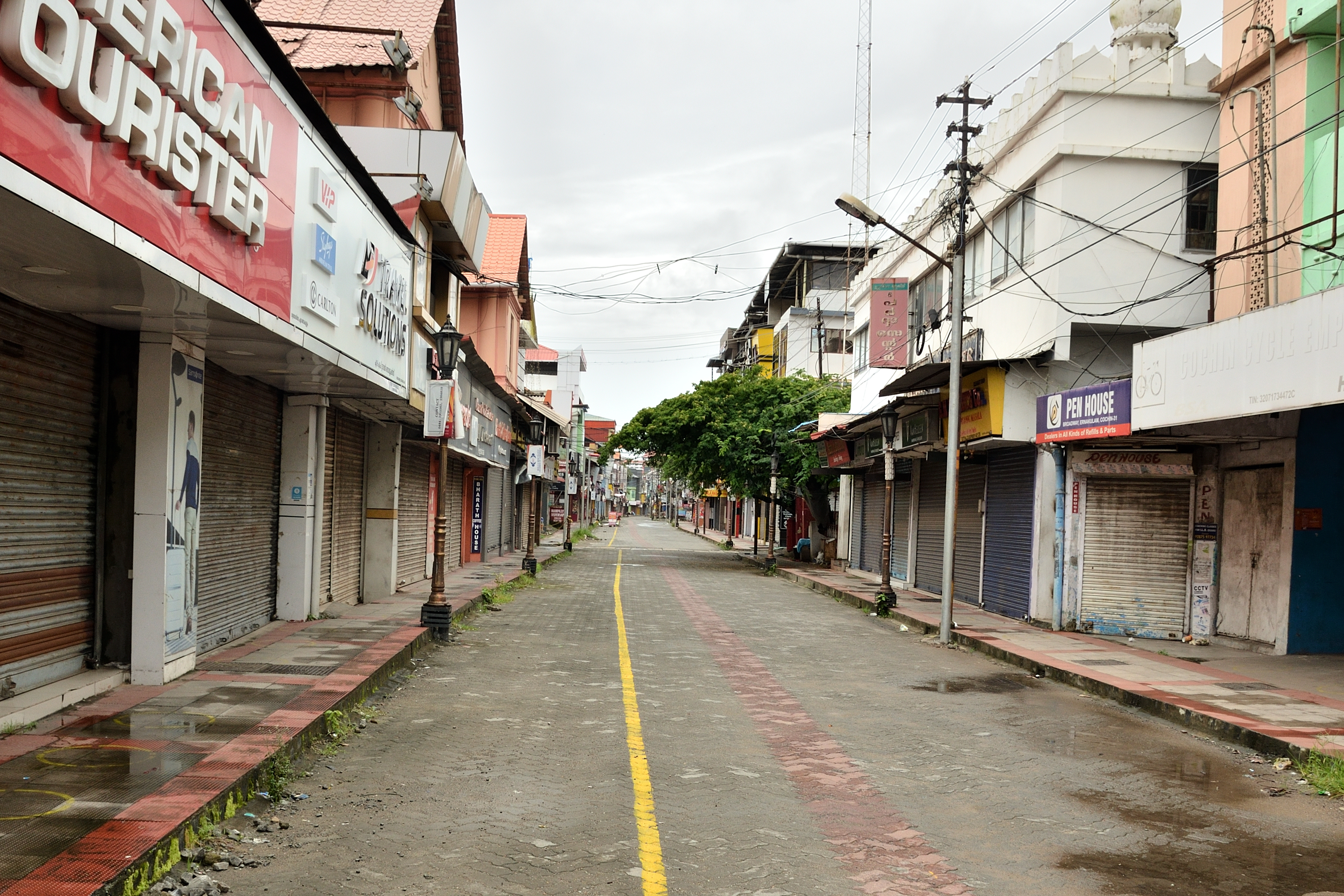
- Interactive map of Broadway, Ernakulam
- Length: 2.0 km (1.2 mi)
- Location: Ernakulam, Kochi, Kerala, India
- From: Basin Road
- To: Chamber Road

Broadway Ernakulam is a shopping street situated at Kochi in Kerala state, India. It is one of the oldest shopping areas in the city. Most wholesale dealers in the city of kochi have their base of operations here, therefore broadway street is popular among local retailers and regular customers.

== History ==
Broadway was the only shopping street in Ernakulam during early 20th century. Initially the shopping street was located at Mattancherry. When the British took over Cochin from the Dutch, the market moved out of Mattancherry to Kochi, which had everything from safety pins to clothes and hardware on offer. Broadway had set of coveted tailors right from the start of 20th century. Prominent among those were J. Newfield and Company, which made the best three-piece suits at the time, Koya Hassan and the Bharatha Tailoring Company, which was famous for the uniforms it made for the State chauffeurs. The White Hall Silk Palace, set up in the 1920s by a Muslim trader from Palakkad, was a textile hotspot. Valavi and Company is a shop which started in 1899 on broadway street. They did business in paper, tyres and liquor imported from Europe.

== Shopping Street ==
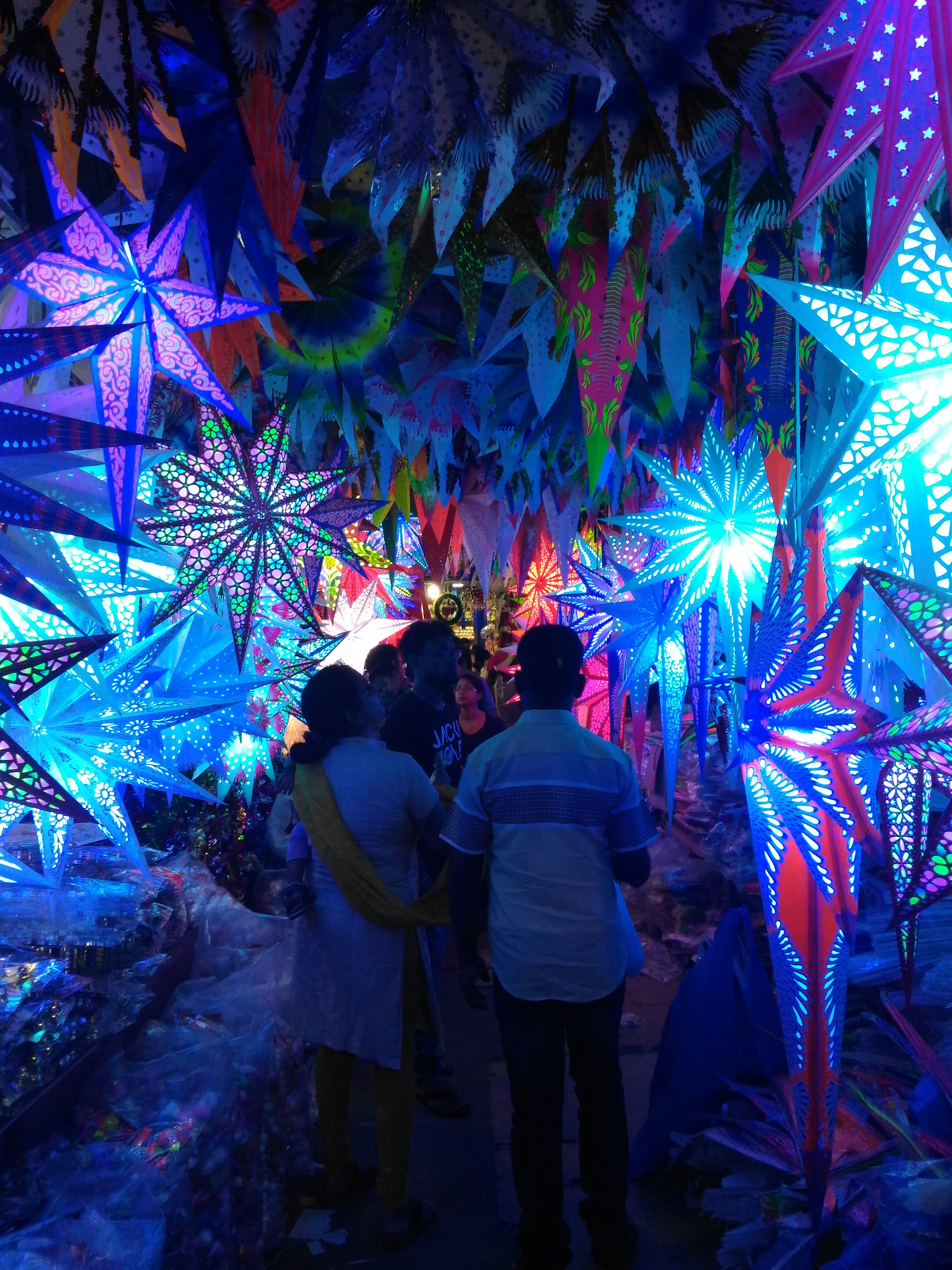
A street of Christmas star shops

Broadway Shopping street covers an area of two kilometer radius road which is sandwiched between Marine Drive, Kochi and MG Road. Quite ironically given its name, the area is characterized by narrow roads. The market canal passes through Broadway and Market Road. The shopping street is a car-free pedestrian zone. Broadway adjoins Ernakulam Market where there are many wholesale shops as well.

== Shops ==
At Broadway, one can find diverse items ranging from old copper pots to latest fashion in clothing along with jewellery, books, perfumes, spices. The Spice market of Kochi at Broadway street is a wholesale market considered for good quality spices and condiments.

== Footfalls ==
There are around 1,000 shops functioning in the two-km radius of Broadway. It is estimated that the market sees a footfall of minimum 5,000 people on holidays but the numbers would touch 20,000 on working days. In 2016, sales at the Broadway market averaged 5 crore per month as per Broadway Shop Owners Association.

=== Peak Shopping Seasons ===
The peak shopping season at Broadway Kochi is during festivals of Vishu, Onam and Christmas.

== Broadway Renovation Project ==
In 2009, Centre for Heritage Environment and Development and the Kerala Sustainable Urban Development Project, had submitted a Rs. 30-crore-project for the conservation efforts of the Broadway. Though the project was submitted in the first phase of JNNURM, it failed to take off due to cost escalation and flaws in the DPR. In 2013, a revised detailed project report (DPR) was submitted for funding under the JNNURM transition funding period. The estimated cost for the project was Rs. 25 cr
