= High Druid of Shannara =

Novel trilogy by Terry Brooks

- Jarka Ruus (2003); Tanequil (2004); Straken (2005)
- Author: Terry Brooks
- Country: United States
- Language: English
- Discipline: Epic fantasy
- Publisher: Del Ray Books
- Published: August 26, 2003 – September 6, 2005
- Media type: Print (hardback & paperback)
- No. of books: 3

High Druid of Shannara is a trilogy of fantasy novels in the Shannara series by Terry Brooks. Set 20 years after the events of The Voyage of the Jerle Shannara, the series chronicles the adventures of Pen Ohmsford as he seeks to rescue his aunt, the High Druid Grianne Ohmsford.

== Books ==
=== Jarka Ruus ===
The first novel in the High Druid trilogy chronicles the banishment of Grianne Ohmsford, the High Druid, to the dark world of the Forbidding by Shadea a'Ru through the employment of a magic known as liquid night. Grianne's nephew, Penderrin "Pen" Ohmsford mounts a rescue mission far into the Northland in an attempt to bring her back into the Four Lands.

=== Tanequil ===
The second novel of the High Druid trilogy details Pen's quest to find aid from the magic Tanequil tree, the deployment of a powerful new weapon by the corrupt Federation army, and the trials of the incarcerated Grianne in the Forbidding.

=== Straken ===
The final novel of the High Druid trilogy brings the adventure to rescue the High Druid from the Forbidding and defeat the Federation army to its conclusion. In addition, it brings an end to the demon's plot to release the demons from the Forbidding.
