= Sridar Theatre =

Cinema hall in Kochi, India

- Sridar Cinema
- Address: Shanmugham Road, Marine Drive, Kochi, Kerala, India
- Owner: Shenoys family

Construction
- Opened: 1964
- Years active: 1964–present

Sridar Theatre or Sridar Cinema is a cinema theatre in the South Indian city of Kochi, Kerala. Located in the Shanmugham Road, Marine Drive, near to Penta Menaka, it was opened in 1964. Sridar theatre is the first air conditioned theatre in Kerala as well as the first theatre in the state to introduce the dolby sound system.

== History ==
Sridar theatre was opened in 1964, which was the third theatre by Shenoy family. The theater was named after Shridhar Shenoy, the deceased son of Lakhman Shenoy. The theater was opened by V.V. Giri, then Governor of Kerala and later President of India. At that time, in Kochi, the Hollywood movies were released at Sridar theatre. Sridhar is also the first theater in Kerala to introduce the dolby sound system. The first 3D digital projector in Kerala came in Sridhar in 2009 with the release of the movie Avatar.

== See also ==
- Shenoys Theatre
- Padma Theatre
