= Sri Padmanabha Theatre =

Cinema hall in Thiruvananthapuram, India

Coordinates: 08°31′N 76°56′E

- Interactive map of Sri Padmanabha Theatre
- Address: West Fort Road, East Fort, Chalai, Thiruvananthapuram, Kerala, India

Construction
- Opened: 1936
- Reopened: 1972 (present structure)
- Years active: 1936–present

Sri Padmanabha Theatre is a cinema theatre in the South Indian city of Thiruvananthapuram, Kerala. Located in Chalai, it was opened in 1936 and is one of the oldest theatres in Kerala. Sri Padmanabha is known among the filmfest delegates as one of the venue for the International Film Festival of Kerala. It is considered as part of cinema culture of Thiruvananthapuram.

== History ==
Sri Padmanabha Theatre was started in 1936 by renowned Malayalam film producer and director and founder of Merryland Studio, P. Subramaniam. It was the second theatre to come in Thiruvananthapuram after the New Theatre. During that time a big tent was built and a single projector was used to run the film with three intervals. There were three types of ticket classes that day. At the front is the floor ticket, where people sat on that sand. After that is the bench and after that is the chair. When 700 to 800 people gather, the tent is pulled to make it bigger. Thus the cinema exhibition at Sri Padmanabha at that time was able to run a movie even by accommodating 1,000 to 1,500 people.

The theatre did not change much during the old tent era. In 1972, P. Subramaniam's son S. Chandran took over and modernised it. It was opened on 11 February 1972 with new facilities, including air-conditioning. The Tamil film Agathiyar was the first show in the theatre after the transformation from the tent. S. Chandran's son Girish Chandran took charge of the theatre in 1997, and it underwent a major facelift. It included a new JBL sound system, including a Dolby processor. Sri Padmanabha was one of the first theatres in Kerala to try the Dolby DTH JBL combination. In 2011, Sri Padmanabha changed the seats completely and made a facelift again. After this, the trend of making two or three theaters came in Kerala as the large single-screen theaters could not afford the operating costs. As part of this, in 2013, a part of the lower class of Sri Padmanabha was replaced and a theater called Devipriya was established. In 2018, a major fire happened in the theater. After the incident, the same year it was completely renewed again by only retaining the theatre structure.

== See also ==
- Padma Theatre
- Shenoys Theatre
- Ragam Theatre
