= Ragam Theatre =

Cinema hall in Thrissur, India

- BLM Ragam Theatre Dolby Atmos
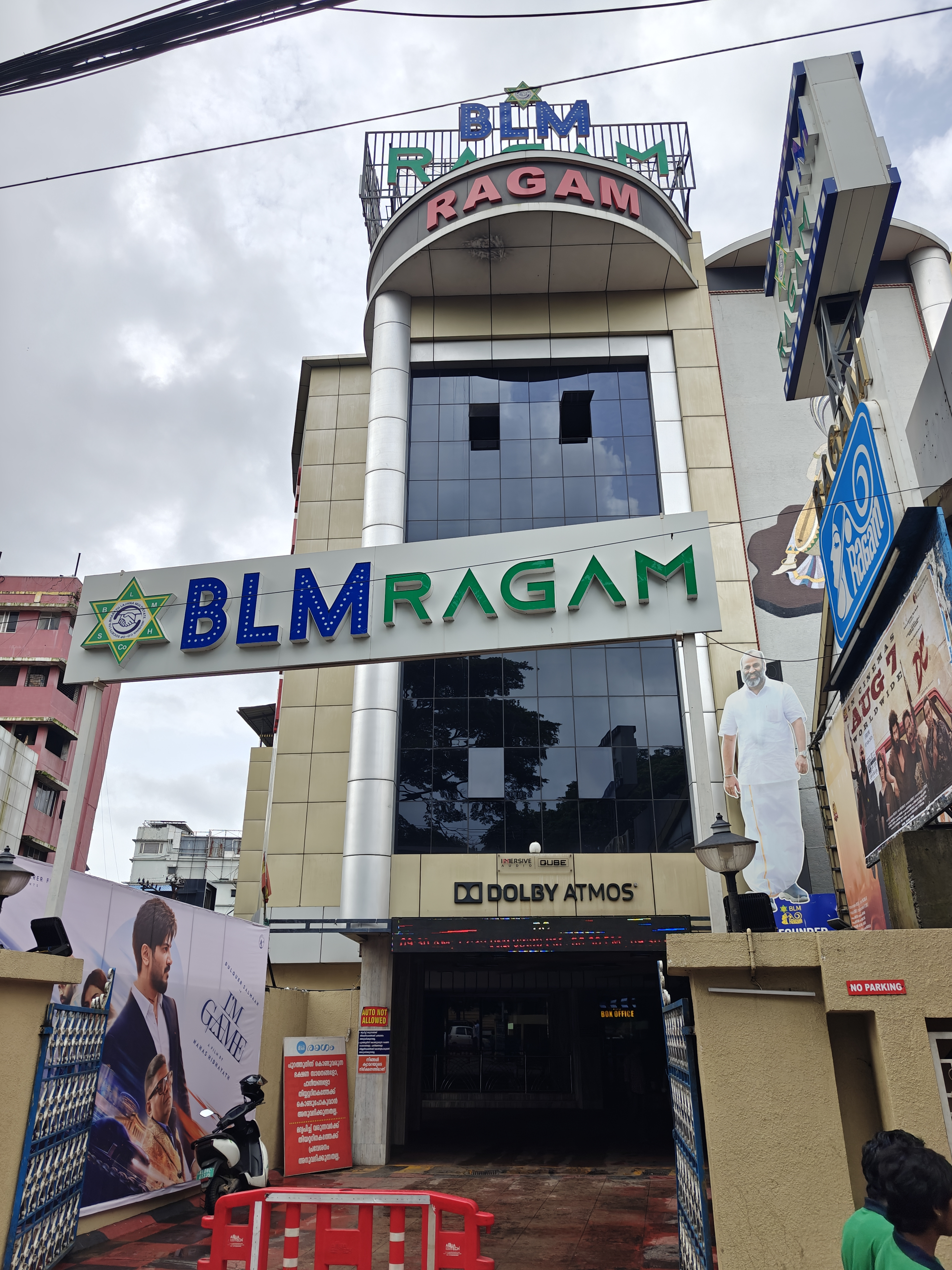
- Ragam Theatre in 2026
- Interactive map of Ragam Theatre
- Address: Swaraj Round S Road, near Dhanlaxmi Bank, Kuruppam, Veliyannur, Thrissur, Kerala, India
- Coordinates: 10.522444°N 76.213810°E
- Owner: Bharat Lejan Multi-State Housing Cooperative Society (BLM)
- Capacity: 1200+ (1974–2015); 800 (2018–present)
- Type: Single screen

Construction
- Opened: August 1974
- Closed: February 2015
- Reopened: October 2018
- Rebuilt: 2018
- Years active: 1974–2015; 2018–present

Ragam Theatre Dolby Atmos is a cinema theatre in Thrissur, a city in the South Indian State of Kerala. It was opened in 1974. Until its temporary closure in February 2015, Ragam was billed as one of the largest single-screen theatres in Kerala with a seating capacity for more than 1200 people. It was reopened in October 2018 after a major renovation. Ragam theatre is considered a cultural landmark building in Thrissur.

== History ==
Ragam theatre was opened in 1974 by K.J Francis. Ramu Karyat's Nellu was the first film screened at Ragam on 24 August 1974. For the 50-day screening of the film, Prem Naseer, Jayabharathi, Adoor Bhasi, Shankarady, Ramu Karyat and some other celebrities came to the theatre. Ragam was the largest building in Thrissur at the time of its opening. With more than 1100 seats, it was also one of the largest theatres in the state in terms of seating capacity. The theatre was started using the advanced technology of that time. Ragam was the first theatre in Kerala to introduce Dolby-Digital sound system. In theatres of Kerala, the tradition of curtain raising before the screening of every show with the music of an English song was started at Ragam. It was the first theatre in Thrissur to introduce air conditioning.

The name of the Ragam was changed to Georgettan's Ragam when George Nereparampil bought the theatre. On 8 February 2015, the theatre was closed for building a new industrial complex by retaining the theatre. The last film shown in the theatre before its closing was Amayum Muyalum. The plan was to build a 16-storey industrial complex called Geo Mall where the theater stood. But the building was not demolished even after four years due to some legal issues. When the plans did not go as expected, the owner decided to reopen the theatre. Ragam was reopened after a major renovation on 10 October 2018 with the screening of Kayamkulam Kochunni. The existing 1100 seats were reduced to 800 seats after they were widened and softened.

== See also ==
- Shenoys Theatre
- Padma Theatre
- Apsara Theatre
