= Sarita Savita Sangeeta =

Multiplex cinema hall in Kochi, India

Sarita Savita Sangeeta Cinemas
- Sarita Savita Sangeeta in 2026
- Interactive map of Sarita Savita Sangeeta Cinemas
- Address: Banerji Road, Kochi, Kerala, India
- Coordinates: 9°59′04″N 76°16′40″E
- Owner: K P Issac & Sons Pvt Ltd
- Type: Multiplex

Construction
- Opened: 1981; 45 years ago
- Closed: 2021; 5 years ago (Only Sarita for renovation)
- Reopened: August 2026; 2 months ago (Sarita after renovation)
- Rebuilt: 2026; 0 years ago (Only Sarita)
- Years active: 1981–present

Sarita-Savita-Sangeeta Cinemas is a multi-theatre complex located in the city of Kochi in Kerala. Located on Banerji Road in Ernakulam, it was opened in 1981 and is the first three-in-one theatre complex in Kerala. The theatre complex consists of three screening halls, namely, Sarita, Savita, and Sangeeta. Before closed for renovation in 2021, Sarita alone had a seating capacity of 1200 which was one of the biggest in Kerala.

Sarita was reopened in August 2026 after renovation with its seating capacity reduced to 713. With a 60-by-25-foot screen, Sarita has one of the largest cinema screens in the state. The theatre complex is considered a cultural landmark of Kochi, and the junction where it is located in known as Sarita Junction.

== History ==
The Saritha–Savitha–Sangeetha theatre complex was opened on Banerji Road in Kochi in 1981 with its construction beginning in 1976. It is billed as the first multiplex-style theatre complex in Kerala. Pathrose Issac and his four sons owned the theatres and they ran it through the company KP Issac and Sons. The complex was inaugurated by minister Baby John officially on 23 December 1981. Saritha had an original seating capacity of 1200 and was equipped with 70 mm projection. The theatres were used as venues for film festivals, including the Kochi International Film Festival in 2012 and the Kochi edition of the International Film Festival of Kerala in 2021.

Saritha theatre was closed in 2021 for renovation while both Savita and Sangeeta remained operational. It was reopened on 29 August 2026 with its seating capacity reduced to 713.

== See also ==
- Banerji Road
- Shenoys Theatre
- Padma Theatre
