= Nidra (1981 film) =

- Directed by: Bharathan
- Written by: Ananthu; Vijayan Karote (Dialogues)
- Screenplay by: Bharathan
- Produced by: K. J. Joseph
- Starring: Vijay Menon; Shanthi Krishna; K. P. A. C. Lalitha; Kaval Surendran
- Cinematography: Ramachandra Babu
- Edited by: N. P. Suresh
- Music by: G. Devarajan; 13AD
- Production company: Cherupushpam Films
- Distributed by: Cherupushpam Films
- Release date: 12 March 1981
- Country: India
- Language: Malayalam

Nidra is a 1981 Indian Malayalam-language film, directed by Bharathan and produced by K. J. Joseph. The film stars Vijay Menon, Shanthi Krishna, K. P. A. C. Lalitha and Kaval Surendran in the lead roles. The film has musical score by G. Devarajan and 13AD.

== Plot ==
Raju and Aswathy are neighbors/childhood friends and get closer as they grow up even when Raju is from a rich background and Aswathy from a poor family. Raju's father calls up Aswathy's mother and proposes their marriage while also mentioning Raju's mentally disturbed past due to his mother's demise, while reassuring her that he is completely normal now after medication. Aswathy's mother does not agree to the alliance fearing for her daughter's safety but has to agree when Aswathy tells her that they have been in a relationship since their adolescence and want to marry each other despite him having a history of mental issues. The marriage happens even though Raju being highly unpredictable and introverted, spending most of his time inside his room and estate outhouse which he uses for his current hobby of space research. Aswathy gets to know of Raju's nature when he suddenly attacks him with a ball while playing and injuring her head. She covers up the incident in front of others as an accident to prevent further issues and backlash from Raju's hot headed brother Vishwam who is handling the businesses and running the household at the absence of their partially paralyzed father. Vishwam is trying to sell off their estate which is opposed by Raju who tells about this to their father and subsequently leads to an argument between father and Vishwam. One day while playing with their youngest brother Manoharan, Raju gets another schizophrenic episode and hallucinates that Manoharan is trying to attack him with the cricket bat. He starts attacking Manoharan and is beat up and tied to a pillar by Vishwam to stop him. Raju is Hospitalized and the doctor advises Aswathy to divert his mind by spicing up their marital life. Another time when Vishwam's in laws visit the house to invite them for their younger daughter's marriage, Raju is humiliated at the dining table by Vishwam when Raju was trying to have his lunch before the guests turn. Raju turns violent at this, creates a ruckus, and tries to commit suicide by overdosing on his medication. He is seen by Aswathy and saved narrowly with the doctor advising the family to keep the medication out of his reach.

In another instance, Vishwam's child was left alone to play by Manoharan when he was given the child to keep him occupied by Vishwam's wife. Raju saves the unattended child from drowning but is accused by Vishwam's wife of not taking care of the child properly, duly developing into an argument between her and Aswathy. Aswathy and Raju leave the house and spends their days carefree at a beach resort of Hippies for some time, before Vishwam finds them and brings them back. When the prospective buyers for the estate turns up at their house, Raju fights with them telling that the place is not for sale and is interrupted by an angry Vishwam leading to rising tension between the two. That night Raju again has an episode of madness where he tries to stab Vishwam at his room. He is hospitalized and subjected to shock treatment. He recovers slowly at the company of Aswathy at the hospital and is ecstatic to learn that they are expecting their baby soon. When they visit his outhouse one day after getting discharged, Raju finds out that his place has been demolished since Vishwam already sold the place and the new buyers are fencing up the area. Again getting into a fit of rage, Raju attacks the buyers, their family manager and Vishwam violently, even trying to kill Vishwam by stabbing him. Vishwam, who had a narrow escape, suggests to the family to perform a medical procedure on Raju which will make him a living vegetable, to avoid further problems from him. Aswathy is forced to sign the surgery papers by the family also. After doing so, she goes up to Raju's room and kills Raju by overdosing him on his medication to avoid any further pain to him and commits suicide.

== Cast ==
- Vijay Menon as Raju
- Shanthi Krishna as Aswathy
- KPAC Lalitha as Bhargaviyamma
- Kaval Surendran as Sankaran
- Lalu Alex as Vishwam
- Lavanya as Indira
- Master Manohar as Manu
- P. K. Abraham as Raju's father
- Jayasree as Ammu

== Soundtrack ==
The music was composed by G. Devarajan and 13AD and the lyrics were written by Yusufali Kechery and Pinson Correya.

No.	Song	Singers	Lyrics	Length (m:ss)
1	"Dhanya Nimishame"	K. J. Yesudas	Yusufali Kechery	
2	"When You Are A Stranger"	Antony Isaac	Pinson Correya	
