= Sea Lord =

Sea lord(s) or Sealord(s) may refer to:

== Military ==
- First Sea Lord, the military head of the Naval Service of the United Kingdom
- Second Sea Lord, the deputy of the First Sea Lord
- Sea lords, senior members of the British Board of Admiralty from 1628 to 1964
- Operation Sealords, a military operation during the Vietnam War

== Other ==
- Sea Lord (novel), a 1989 novel by Bernard Cornwell.
- Sealord, a brand of canned tuna campaigned against by Greenpeace Aotearoa New Zealand
- Sealord deal, a fisheries agreement between Māori and the New Zealand Government as part of the Treaty of Waitangi claims and settlements
- Sealord of Braavos, a ruler in the fantasy world of A Song of Ice and Fire
- Sealord Hotel, a hotel in the Indian city of Kochi
- Sealords, a student society among the Confraternities in Nigeria
- Flensburg Sealords, an American football team in Germany

== See also ==
- List of water deities, for Poseidon and others known as 'lord of the sea'
