= Administration of Kochi =

Kochi City officials
| Mayor | M. Anil Kumar |
| Deputy Mayor | K.A Ansiya |
| Police Commissioner ( IG & Commissioner) | C. H. Nagaraju IPS |
| Secretary (Kochi Municipal Corporation) | M.Babu Abdul Khadeer, IRPS |

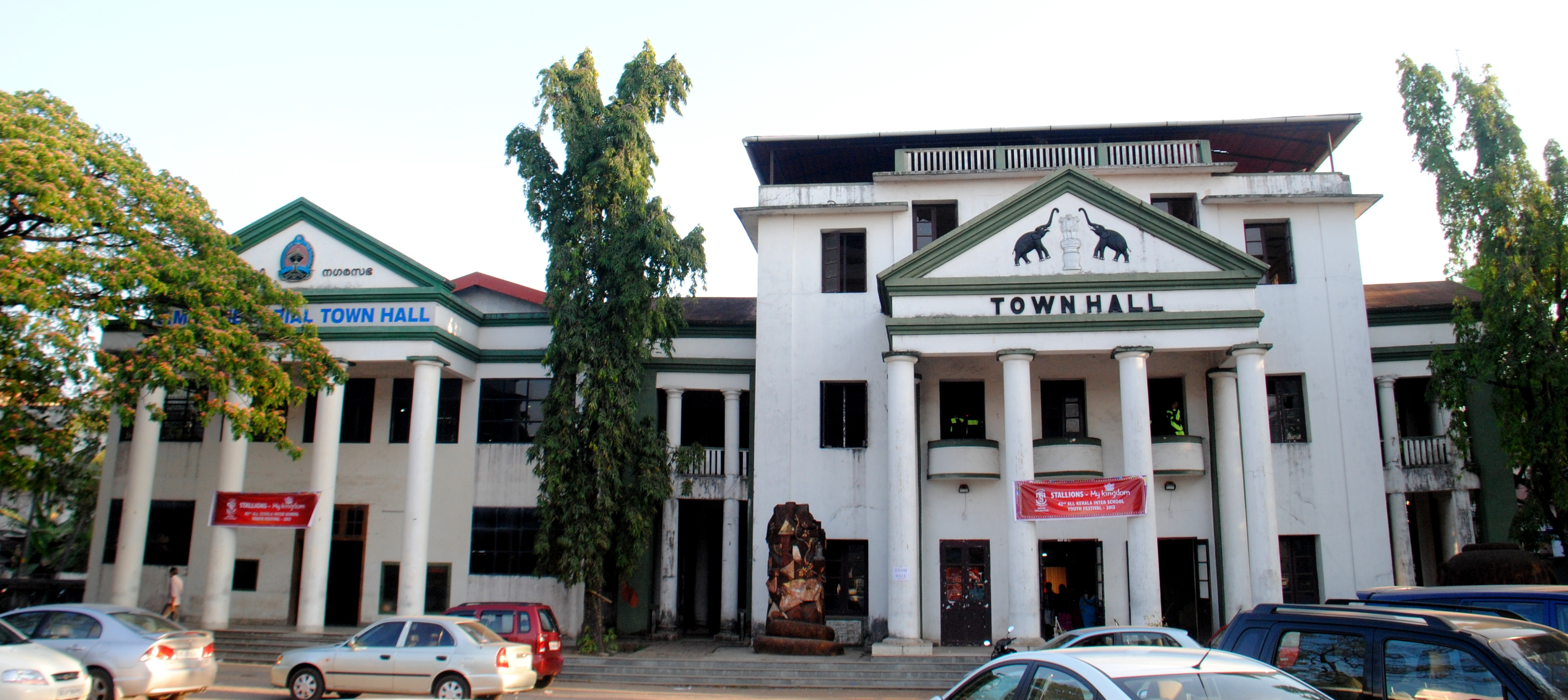
Ernakulam Town Hall

The city is administered by the Kochi Municipal Corporation, headed by a mayor assisted by the Secretary (Commissioner, Kochi Municipal Corporation). For administrative purposes, the city is divided into 74 wards, from which the members of the corporation council are elected for five years. Earlier; Fort Kochi, Mattancherry and Ernakulam were the three Municipalities in Cochin area, which was later merged to form the Kochi Municipal Corporation.

== Corporation offices ==
The corporation has its headquarters in Ernakulam, and zonal offices at Fort Kochi, Mattancherry, Palluruthy, Edappally, Vaduthala and Vyttila. The general administration of the city is handled by the Personnel Department and the Council Standing committee Section. Other departments include that of town planning, health, engineering, revenue and accounts. The corporation is also responsible for waste disposal and sewage management. The city produces more than 600 tons of waste per day and a large portion of waste is decomposed at Brahmapuram Solid Waste plant into organic manure. The supply of potable water, sourced from the Periyar River is handled by Kerala Water Authority with support of Water works department of Kochi Corporation. Electricity is provided by the Kerala State Electricity Board. The GCDA and GIDA are the government agencies initiating and monitoring the development of Greater Cochin area, mainly in developing infrastructure facilities for the city.

== Law and order ==
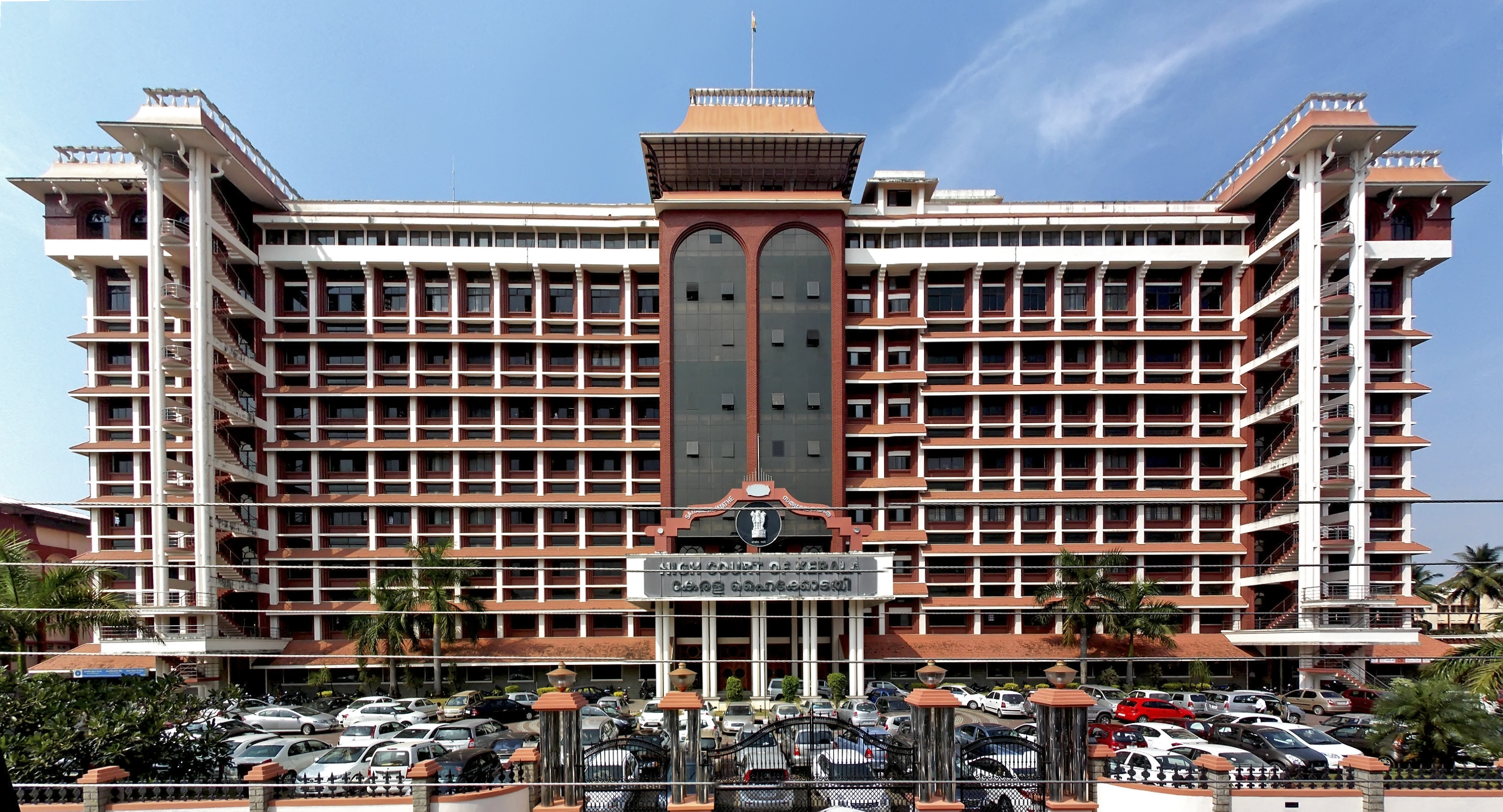
The High Court of Kerala located in the city is the highest court in Kerala

Ernakulam, Kochi, is the seat of High Court of Kerala, the highest judicial body in the state of Kerala and the union territory of Lakshadweep. The Kochi City Police is headed by a Police Commissioner, an Indian Police Service (IPS) officer. The city is divided into five zones and each zone under a circle officer. Apart from regular law & order, the city police comprises the Traffic Police, Narcotics Cell, Riot horse, Armed Reserve Camps, District Crime Records Bureau and a Women's Police station. It operates 19 police stations functioning under the Home Ministry of Government of Kerala. An anti-corruption branch of the Central Bureau of Investigation also operates out of the city. CISF maintains 3 squadrons for providing security to various central and state heavy industries, airport and seaport zones. Other major central agencies are NIA, DRI and Indian Customs due to the presence of major port. According to National Crime Records Bureau (NCRB), Kochi reported significant increase of 193.7 per cent IPC crimes in 2010 compared to 2009, and reported a crime rate of 1,897.8 compared to the 424.1 in whole Kerala. However, Kochi Police officials defended that in major crimes such as murders and kidnapping, the city registered a low crime rate even behind other cities in the state. During the rainy season, a large number of organised burglars come to Kochi from Thiruttu Gramam (Village of thieves) near Tirunelveli in Tamil Nadu and conduct a series of burglaries. Recently the Kerala police has sought the assistance of various residents' associations of Cochin city to tackle this issue.

== Federal Government ==
Kochi Corporation is part of the Ernakulam Lok Sabha constituency in Indian Parliament. The current elected Member of Parliament representing the constituency is Hibi Eden of Indian National Congress.

The Ernakulam Lok Sabha constituency elects six members to the state Legislative Assembly. Out of this, five constituencies, namely Kochi, Ernakulam, Thripunithura, Thrikkakara and Kalamassery represent the city.
