= Queen's Way, Kochi =

Walkway in Kochi, Kerala, India

Queen's Way
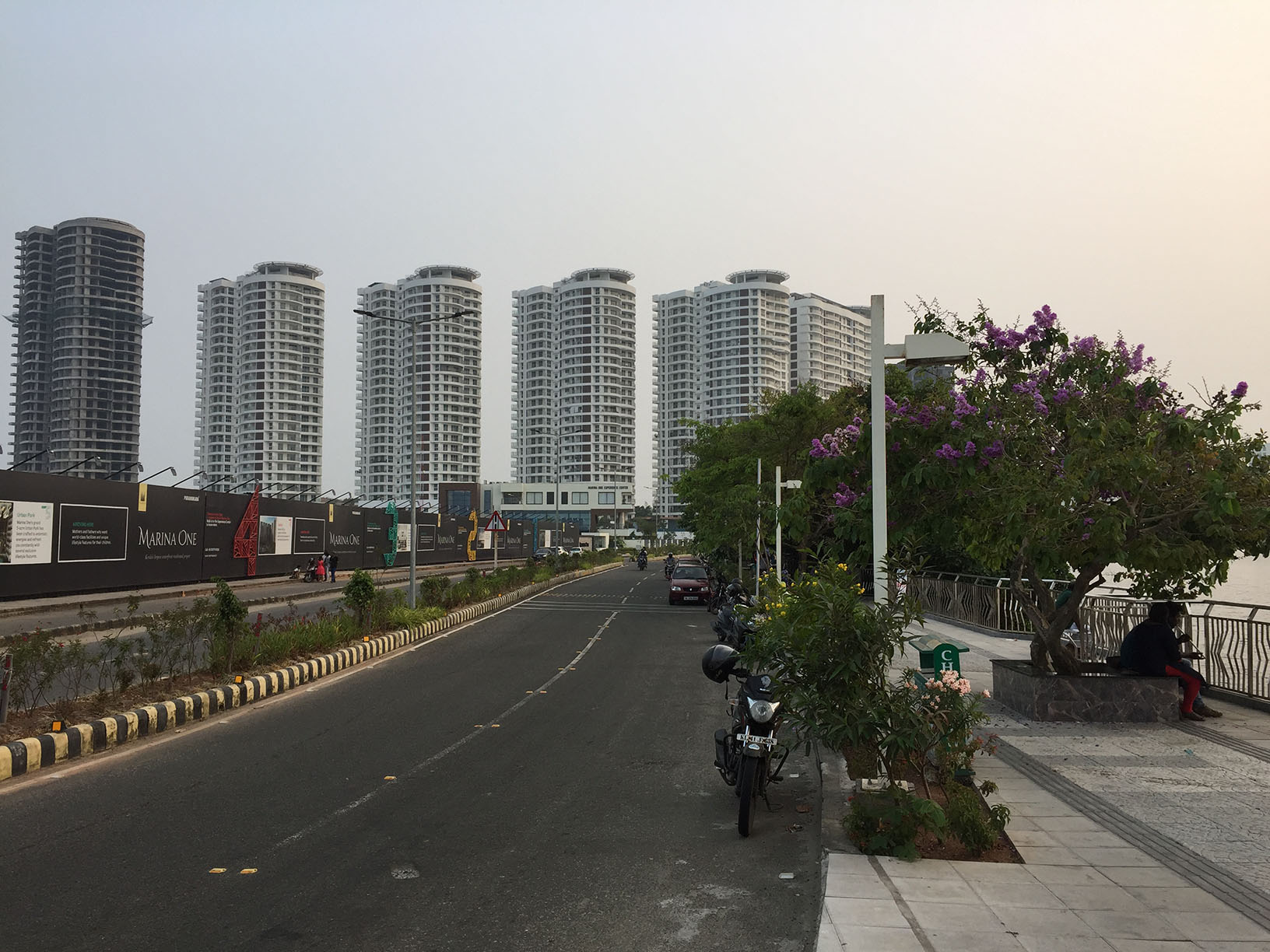
- Location: Kochi, Kerala, India
- Length: 1.80 km
- Funded by: Kerala Tourism Development Corporation
- Governing authority: Goshree Islands Development Authority

Queen's Way is a 1.8 km long walkway in the city of Kochi, Kerala. It is a fully automated musical walkway that stretches from the start of GIDA road to Chathyath Church. The walkway is situated at around 1.5 km from the High Court Junction and 2 km from Marine Drive. It was set up at an initial cost of ₹5 crore (US$520,000) allowed by the Tourism Department.

== Facilities ==
The walkway is fully automated with smart phone-controlled lights. Around 120 benches are erected along the entire stretch of the road for the visitors to relax. An amphitheatre with a seating capacity for 50, lights to beautify trees and LED strips are some of the highlights of the walkway. The walkway is under the surveillance of 21 bullet CCTV cameras and three advanced 360-degree cameras. There are frequent cleaning campaigns undertaken along the protected mangrove forests that line the walkway and adjoining areas in Pachalam and Vaduthala.

== See also ==
- Marine Drive
