= Ground zero (disambiguation) =

Ground zero describes the point on the Earth's surface (its hypocenter) closest to a nuclear detonation. In the case of an explosion above the ground, ground zero refers to the point on the ground directly below the nuclear detonation.

Ground zero may also refer to:

- The World Trade Center site in New York City, after the September 11 attacks
- The hypocenters of the atomic bombings of Hiroshima and Nagasaki
- The central plaza of The Pentagon during the Cold War

== Books ==
- Ground Zero (book), by Andrew Holleran
- Ground Zero, X-Files novel by Kevin J. Anderson
- Ground Zero (Deathlands novel)
- Ground Zero (Repairman Jack novel)
- Ground Zero, novel by Alan Gratz

== Campaigns ==
- Ground Zero (campaign) in the United States, concerning nuclear weapons
- Climate Ground Zero campaign, in the United States, against mountaintop-removal mining

== Video games ==
- Ground Zero: Texas, for the Sega CD
- Metal Gear Solid V: Ground Zeroes

== Films ==
- Ground Zero (1973 film)
- Ground Zero (1987 film)
- At Ground Zero, 1993 film
- Bloodfist VI: Ground Zero, 1995 film
- Resident Evil: Ground Zero, the working title of 2002 film Resident Evil
- Ground Zero (2025 film)

== Music ==
- Ground Zero (band), led by Otomo Yoshihide
- Ground Zero (blues club), owned by actor Morgan Freeman

=== Albums ===
- Ground Zero, album by Vindictiv with Göran Edman and Oliver Hartmann 2009
- Ground Zero (13AD album)
- Ground Zero (As Blood Runs Black album)

=== Songs ===
- "Ground Zero", a song by Kerry Livgren from the 1980 album Seeds of Change
- "Ground Zero" (song), by Chris Cornell
- "Ground Zero", a song by Lil Wayne from the 2010 album Rebirth
- "Ground Zero", a song by Parkway Drive from the 2022 album Darker Still

== Radio and television ==
- Ground Zero (TV program), a 1997–2001 Australian music television program that aired on Network Ten
- Ground Zero: In Your House, a 1997 World Wrestling Federation pay-per-view event
- Hotel Ground Zero, a 2009 television documentary, United States

== Art ==
- Ground Zero Gallery
