= St. Albert's HSS, Ernakulam =

Secondary school in India

St. Albert's HSS

Location
- Banerji Road; Kochi, Kerala 682 018; India; 9.9849°N 76.2786°E

Information
- Type: Aided school
- Motto: Knowledge, Work & Service
- Established: 1892
- Principal: Bilfy V Sebastian
- Headmaster: Joseph Sen
- Grades: Classes 1 to 12
- Enrollment: 1800
- Language: English

St. Albert's HSS (St. Albert's Higher Secondary School) is a boys school at Banerji Road in Kochi, India. It was popularly known as St. Albert's High School till 1998, when it was upgraded to a higher secondary school. It is the oldest boys school in Kochi. It has 1800 students and 85 teachers and non teaching staff on a five-acre (2.0 ha) campus.

== History ==
St. Albert's School was established by Fr. Candidus, an Italian missionary with the permission of Archdiocese of Verapoly with 31 students on 1 February 1892. The land was donated by Maharaja of Cochin and it was known as 'Thumbaparambu' for the local people, as it was full of 'Thumba' (Leucas aspera). In 1896, the school was upgraded into lower secondary school. In 1897, two Gothic styled buildings were constructed and it became an important landmark in Kochi city. By 1898, the school was upgraded into High School and received recognition from Madras University. In 1963 a Teachers Training Institute was constructed in the campus. In 1984, a new pyramid shaped (Pagoda) building was constructed over the old U-shaped building facing the school ground. As the school celebrated its centenary in 1992, the two old Gothic buildings were refurnished by replacing the wooden first floor with concrete floor and constructed an open stage at the school ground in memory of Msgr. Chakiamury. In 1994, a new nigh school building (Honey Comb) was constructed over old LP building. In 1998 the school was upgraded into higher secondary school.

== Courses and activities ==
St. Albert's Higher Secondary School building

The school offers the Secondary School Leaving Certificate Examination (SSLC), which is taken at the end of Class X and Higher Secondary course (Plus Two). The courses offered are Science Group: Physics, Chemistry, Mathematics and Biology; Humanities Group: History, Economics, Political Science and Sociology; Commerce Group: Business Studies, Accountancy, Economics and Mathematics. The school has units of National Cadet Corps, National Service Scheme, Student Police Cadet Project and Junior Red Cross. Besides, the school provides good facilities for sports and games to each and every child in the school, especially in Football, Cricket, Hockey and athletics. It has one of the largest grounds for any school in Kochi City.

== Notable alumni ==
- George Vakayil (1883-1931), Saintly Priest
- Joseph Attipetty (June 25, 1894 – January 21, 1970), The first native Archbishop of Verapoly
- M.P. Paul (1904-1952), Malayalam Literary Critic.
- Edappally Raghavan Pillai (1909-1936), Malayalam Poet
- Vyloppilli Sreedhara Menon (1911-1985), Malayalam Poet
- Sebastian Kunjukunju Bhagavathar (1901-1985), Malayalam Actor, Singer, and Author.
- Cornelius Elanjikal (1918-2011), Former Archbishop of Verapoly.
- Ponjikkara Rafi (1924-1992), Malayalam Novelist
- Sudhindra Thirtha (1926–2016), Former Spiritual Head of Kashimath
- K. Sukumaran (judge), Rtd Judge of High Court of Kerala & Mumbai.
- Francis Kallarakal, Former Archbishop of Archdiocese of Verapoly
- Jerry Amaldev, Malayalam Music Director
- Sebastian Paul, Former Member of Parliament
- Jose (actor)
- Jude Attipetty, Malayalam Cinema & Serial Director
- Machan Varghese (1960-2011) Famous Malayalam Actor.
- Tini Tom, Malayalam Actor.
