= Nilaavinte Naattil =

- Directed by: Vijay Menon
- Written by: Vijay Menon; M. Muhammad; V. Chakravarthy; Rajiv Vijay Raghavan (dialogues); Vijay Menon (dialogues)
- Screenplay by: Vijay Menon; V. Chakravarthy
- Starring: Prem Nazir; Seema; Bharath Gopi; Kundara Johnny
- Cinematography: Madhu Ambatt
- Edited by: Ayyappan; Vijay Menon
- Music by: Shyam
- Production company: Poornakumbha Films
- Distributed by: Poornakumbha Films
- Release date: 7 March 1986
- Country: India
- Language: Malayalam

Nilaavinte Naattil is a 1986 Malayalam film directed by Vijay Menon starring Prem Nazir, Seema, Bharath Gopi, Shaila Shanker, Lalu Alex and M. G. Soman. The movie deals with the feelings of a young girl who is alone in a big lonely house at night and is left with no other option than being seduced into sex by a stranger.

== Plot ==
The movie starts with a girl walking lonely into a posh family residence where she is supposed to do babysitting for a night. The couple were ready to attend a club party and went.

Then comes the lovely filming of a young girl, alone in a big house at night. She is feeling lonely and tries to concentrate on reading, but fails and starts feeling romantic. Incidentally, her lover enters the house and seduces her into sex. She forces him out after some time. On the way to the first floor, where the baby was sleeping, she sees a stranger out a window, which makes her frightened. At the same time, the couple attending the party gets the news that the wife's ex-husband who is undergoing treatment in a mental asylum escaped from there. They are worried that he might come to their home.

Then, opening the front door on a calling bell, the baby sitter found the dead body of her lover. The appearance of a strange middle-aged man occurs now, who claims to hear a screaming which led him into the house. The babysitter, being upset, seeks help from the stranger. He tries to comfort her. She tells him about the frightening face she saw through the window and expresses her fear to him. He asked her to follow him upstairs. He held her and carried her to the first floor. Later he revealed that he is the ex-husband of the lady in that home. The memories of his wife made him eager for sex. He tried to seduce the girl. He removed her sari, when she is left with no other option than obeying. He had a forced sex with her. In the climax, the couple, with the help of cops, get the baby back and kill the stranger.

It is a different type of movie which was never experienced in Malayalam film industry before or later, but it seems like the movie is not widely accepted in theaters. Maybe because of the period in which films dealing with such subjects were not acceptable. The success story could be different, if this movie were released nowadays, when something new would be accepted. The film is not available on video release.

== Cast ==
- Prem Nazir as Ramesh
- Seema as Lakshmi
- Bharath Gopi as Balachandra Panikkar
- Shaila Shanker as Mary (Babysitter)
- Kundara Johny as Inspector John
- Lalu Alex as Johny (Lover of Mary)
- M. G. Soman as Venu
- Satheesh
- Sunder
- Ben
- Gilbanks
- Delphin

== Soundtrack ==
The music was composed by Shyam and the lyrics were written by Kavalam Narayana Panicker.

No.	Song	Singers	Lyrics	Length (m:ss)
1	"Aattakkuruvi"	S. Janaki	Kavalam Narayana Panicker	
