= 13AD (band) =

Rock band from Kochi, India

- Origin: Kochi, India
- Genres: Hard rock Blues-rock; Heavy metal
- Members: Eloy Isaacs; Paul KJ; Jackson Aruja; Floyd Libera; Anand Sreeraj

13AD is a prominent classic and hard rock band from Kochi, India.

== History and formation ==
13AD was one of India's topmost rock bands from the 1980s to the mid-1990s. The band was formed in 1977. The line up at that time was Stanley Luiz on vocals, Eloy Isaacs on guitar and vocals, Ashley Pinto on guitars and vocals, Anil Raun on bass guitar, and Petro Correia on drums. 13AD used to play in Sealord Hotel in Kochi, Kerala, India.

They released two albums, Ground Zero and Tough on the Streets in the 1990s. George Thomas Jr. (Viju), who used to jam with the band, urged them to write their own songs. Thomas wrote the songs "Ground Zero" and "Revelations". The song "Ground Zero" from the album Ground Zero was a hit during the 1990s.

With the release of their debut album Ground Zero (1989), the band grabbed the attention of young India. After relentless travelling, the band brought out another album Tough on the Streets (1992).

In 1994, they got the opportunity to perform overseas at a few high-end restaurants in Muscat, Oman. They played at Pavo Real, a Mexican Restaurant, where the band gained further fame and popularity among fans in the Middle East. This line up included George Peter, Pinson Correia and lady crooner Sunita Menon.

== Reunion and recent happenings ==
After a break, the band had announced a reunion in 2008. During the reunion concert, they announced the release of their third album City Blues.

13AD plan to bring forth a new bilingual album.

On 11 January 2024, 13AD played at a sold-out concert in their hometown of Kochi. An additional concert was played on 6 April 2024 at Thevara College in Kochi.

== Band members ==
- Anand Sreeraj - vocals
- Eloy Isaacs - lead and rhythm guitars
- Jackson Aruja - keyboards
- Pinson Correia - drums
- Floyd Libera - drums
- Paul K J - bass

== Former members ==
- George Peter - vocals
- Stanley Luiz – vocals
- Glen La Rive – vocals
- Rose – vocals
- Nadine Gregory - Vocals
- Sarina – vocals
- Sunita Menon – vocals
- Ashley Pinto – guitar, vocals
- Anil Raun – bass guitar
- Petro Correia – drums

== Discography ==
- 1990 – Ground Zero
- 1993 – Tough on the Streets

== In popular media ==
A reference to the band is shown as a wall art in the Malayalam movie Bheeshma Parvam during the song 'Parudeesa'.
