= Vijay Menon =

Indian actor

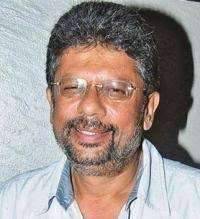
- Born: London, England, United Kingdom
- Occupations: Film director; editor; actor; dubbing artist
- Years active: 1981–present
- Children: 2

Vijay Menon is an Indian actor, editor, director and dubbing artist in Malayalam cinema. He has acted in more than 100 films in South Indian languages. He mainly handles in character roles and supporting roles. He has won Kerala State Film Awards thrice.

== Biography ==
Vijay Menon made his debut in Malayalam cinema with Bharathan’s Nidra (1981) and has since appeared in over 100 films, mostly in supporting roles. In 1983, he appeared in the Tamil film Kan Sivanthal Man Sivakkum and the Malayalam film Rachana.

Menon is a graduate in filmmaking from a film institute in Pune. In 1986, he made his directorial debut with Nilavinte Nattil, for which he also served as writer and editor. In 2017, he returned to filmmaking as the writer and director of Vilakkumaram.

He writes articles in The Indian Express about international politics. He won the Kerala State Film Award for Best Dubbing artist in 2011 and 2017 for the movies Melvilasom and Oppam respectively.

== Personal life ==
He is married to Kala Menon, and he has a daughter Leela Malavika Menon and a son Nikhil Menon. His son Nikhil Menon is a screenwriter who wrote the screenplay for the Vilakkumaram.

== Awards and honours ==
Year	Award	Award category	Work
2011	Kerala state film awards	Kerala State Film Award for Best Dubbing Artist	Melvilasom
2017	Kerala state film awards	Kerala State Film Award for Best Dubbing Artist	Oppam
2018	Kerala state film awards	Kerala State Film Award – Special Mention	Hey Jude
2017	Kerala State Television Awards	Second Best Actor	Nilavum Nakshathrangalum
2018	Kerala State Television Awards	Special jury mention	Kshnaprabhachanchalam

== Filmography ==
=== Actor ===
Year	Title	Role	Notes
1981	Nidra	Raju	
1983	Kann Sivanthaal Mann Sivakkum	Gautam	Tamil
1983	Prem Nazirine Kanmanilla	Kidnapper	
1983	Rachana	Rajan	
1983	Asthi	Dileep	
1984	Nilaavinte Naattil		
1984	Anbulla Malare		
1985	Choodatha Pookal	Suresh	
1986	Meenamasathile Sooryan	Chirukandan	
1988	Isabella		
1989	Varusham 16	Moorthy	Tamil
1990	Iyer the Great		
1990	Anantha Vruthantham	Franky	
1990	Mukham	Vijay	
1990	Prosecution		
1991	Utharakaandam		
1991	Kadhanayika		
1993	Airport	Vijay Menon	Tamil
1994	Sainyam	Terrorist Salim	
1995	The King	Dr. Vijay	
1995	Boxer		
1997	Ezhu Nilaappanthal		
1998	Meenathil Thalikettu	Rozario	
1999	Pathram	Photographer Vipin	
2001	Agrahaaram		
2001	Pranayaaksharangal		
2004	Vajram	Dr. Nissar	
2004	Masanagudi Mannadiyar Speaking		
2005	Rajamanikyam	Adv. Lal Cheriyan	
2007	Soorya Kireedam	Dr. Venu	
2007	Thaniye		
2007	Nadiya Kollappetta Rathri	Kalpathi Seetharaman	
2008	Pachamarathanalil		
2009	Bhaarya Swantham Suhruthu		
2009	Banaras	Prof. Ananthakrishnan	
2009	Vairam: Fight for Justice		
2009	Keralotsavam 2009		
2010	Ring Tone		
2010	Nayakan	Adv. Sreenivasan	
2011	Violin		
2012	The King & the Commissioner	Dr. Kishore Balakrishnan	
2012	Father's Day	Noble Mathew	
2012	Nidra	Dr. Roy Peter	
2012	Cobra	Referee	
2012	Karppooradeepam		
2012	Spirit		
2012	Banking Hours 10 to 4	Dr. John	
2013	Careebeyans	Vijayan	
2013	Police Maamman		
2013	Zachariayude Garbhinikal	Dr. Chandykunju	
2014	Mithram		
2015	Jamna Pyari		
2015	Lailaa O Lailaa	Christy	
2015	King Liar	Minister Thomas Chennikkadan	
2015	Salt Mango Tree	Vice Principal	
2016	Kattumakkan	Rahul	
2017	Pokkiri Simon	Mariner Somashekahran	
2018	Hey Jude	Dr. Sebastian Chakkaraparambil	
2018	Antagonist		
2019	Athiran	Prof. P. Subrahmanya Iyer	
2020	Pixelia		
2021	Grahanam		
2022	Mahaveeryar	Veerasimhan	
2022	1921: Puzha Muthal Puzha Vare	Aamu	
2023	Dhoomam	Ajay Varma	
2023	Sesham Mike-il Fathima	Vijay John	
2025	Rekhachithram	Adv. Jacob	
2025	Lokah Chapter 1: Chandra		Cameo
2026	Spa		

=== Dubbing artist ===
Year	Film	Character	Dubbed for
1989	The News	Victor George	Babu Antony
1990	Randam Varavu	Deputy inspector general of police	
1995	Aksharam	Ramji	Tej Sapru
1996	Yuvathurki	CBI Director Jaypal	Kitty
1996	The Prince	Jaffer Bhai	Kitty
1997	Adukkala Rahasyam Angaadi Paattu	Adv.Babu Thomas	Baburaj
1997	Masmaram	Darshandas	Kitty
1999	F. I. R.	Narendra Shetty	Rajeev
1999	Niram	Prakash Mathew	Boban Alummoodan
1999	Olympiyan Anthony Adam	DGP Krishnan Nair	
2009	Calendar	Cleetus	Pratap K. Pothen
2016	Oppam	Vasudevan	Samuthirakani
2017	Adam Joan	Nathen	Madhusudhan Rao
2021	Nayattu	DGP	Ajith Koshy
2021	Michael's Coffee House	Uncle Sam	Mohan Sharma
2022	Sita Ramam (Malayalam Version)	Brid.Abu Thariq	Sachin Khedekar
2023	Garudan	Col.Philip	Thalaivasal Vijay

=== Direction ===
- Nilavinte nattil (1986)
- Pranayaaksharangal (2001)
- Vilakkumaram (2017)

=== Story ===
- Nilavinte nattil (1986)
- Pranayaaksharangal (2001)

=== Dialogue ===
- Nilavinte nattil (1986)
- Pranayaaksharangal (2001)

=== Screenplay ===
- Nilavinte nattil(1986)
- Pranayaaksharangal (2001)
- Vilakkumaram (2017)

=== Editing ===
- Nilavinte nattil (1986)

== Television career ==
Year	Serial	Role	Channel	Notes
2003	Sthree Janmam		Surya TV	
2003-2004	Sthree Oru Saanthwanam		Asianet	
2003	Aalippazham		Surya TV	
2007	Nombarappoovu		Asianet	
2009	Thulabharam		Surya TV	
2007-2009	Ente Manasaputhri	DYSP	Asianet	
2010-2011	Randamathoral		Asianet	
2011	Chila Nerangalil Chila Manushyar		Amrita TV	
2011	Avakashikal	Karan	Surya TV	
2013	Makal		Surya TV	
2013-2014	Pattu Saree		Mazhavil Manorama	
2016-2017	Nilavum Nakshtrangalum	Dr Mahendran		
2018	Police		ACV	
2018	Kshanaprabhachanchalam	Sivashankar	Amrita TV	
2024- Present	Meenu's Kitchen	Mohanachandran	Mazhavil Manorama	
