= Anbulla Malare =

1984 Indian film

- Directed by: B. R. Ravishankar
- Screenplay by: Mahendran
- Produced by: V. V. Babu
- Starring: Shanthi Krishna; Vijay Menon
- Cinematography: Ashok Kumar
- Music by: Ilaiyaraaja
- Release date: 11 May 1984
- Country: India
- Language: Tamil

Anbulla Malare (transl. Dear flower) is a 1984 Indian Tamil-language film directed by B. R. Ravishankar and produced by V. V. Babu. The film stars Vijay Menon and Shanthi Krishna. It was released on 11 May 1984.

== Cast ==
- Vijay Menon
- Shanthi Krishna
- Baby Anju
- Sarath Babu
- Srividya
- Silk Smitha

== Production ==
The film was originally titled Ilaiyuthirkaalam. The song "Kadhal Dhegangal" was shot at Kodaikanal.

== Soundtrack ==
The music was composed by Ilaiyaraaja.

Song	Singers	Lyrics
Alai Meethu Thadumaruthe	S. P. Balasubrahmanyam, Vani Jairam	Vairamuthu
Enna Venum	Grubb Singh, Saibaba	Gangai Amaran
Kadhal Thegangal	P. Susheela, S. P. Balasubrahmanyam	Vairamuthu
Paathingala En Udan Pirappe	S. P. Balasubrahmanyam	Gangai Amaran
Thaaye Thaaye Dharmam	S. P. Balasubrahmanyam	Vairamuthu
Thegam Pon Thegam	S. Janaki	Vairamuthu

== Reception ==
Jayamanmadhan of Kalki praised the acting of Baby Anju, Sarath Babu and Srividya, Mahendran's dialogues and Thyagarajan's natural stunt choreography but felt Ilayaraja disappointed while also panning vulgar humour and editing mistakes in the film's climax.

== Bibliography ==
- Mahendran (2013) [2004]. சினிமாவும் நானும் [Cinema and I] (in Tamil). Karpagam Publications. OCLC 54777094.
