= Apsara Theatre =

Cinema in Kozhikode, India

Magic Frames Apsara Theatre
- Address: Railway station link road, Kozhikode, Kerala, India
- Operator: Magic Frames
- Capacity: 1013

Construction
- Opened: 8 August 1971
- Years active: 1971–2023; 2024–present

The Magic Frames Apsara Theatre is a cinema theatre located in the South Indian city of Kozhikode in Kerala, that was opened in 1971. It is located on Link Road near Kozhikode railway station. With 1013 seats, Apsara is one of the biggest cinemas in Kerala and a heritage landmark of Kozhikode.

== Overview ==
Apsara Theatre was inaugurated on 8 August 1971 by Malayalam actors Prem Naseer and Sharada. The family-owned single screen theatre was founded by Thomman Joseph Kochupuraikal. With a 70 mm screen, at the time of its opening, Apsara was advertised as Kerala's largest air-conditioned theatre. It was one of the few theaters in Kerala with more than 1000 seating capacity. The first movie to be screened at Apsara was Abhijatyam directed by A Vincent. Apsara was a family owned theatre. In May 2023, reports came out that Apsara theatre was facing closure due to some disagreement among the members of the family. Also with the advent of multiplexes, it was not financially profitable to run single-screen theatres. On June 28, Apsara had its last show by screening the movie Thrishanku. Following a one-year hiatus, the Apsara Theatre was reopened in May 2024 after it was taken over by Listin Stephen's Magic Frames. It was rebranded as Magic Frames Apsara.

== See also ==
- Kokers Theatre
- Shenoys Theatre
