= Banerji Road =

Road in Kerala

The Banerji Road in Kochi

Banerji Road is one of the major arteries of downtown Kochi, in the state of Kerala, India. It lies east–west between the High-Court Junction (Marine Drive) in the west, and Ernakulam North in the east. It passed through North Overbridge near Ernakulam North railway station. It is named after Sir A. R. Banerji, former diwan of the Kingdom of Cochin. Most of the parts of the road are four lane with some areas still under 2 lane and works to make 4 lane under construction. Kacherippady Junction and Madhava Pharmacy Junction (MG Road) are main junctions on this road.

Major institutions located on this road include: St. Alberts College, St. Albert's HSS, Ernakulam, St. Antony's CGHSS and Saritha-Savitha-Sangeetha Theatre Complex.
