= Marine Drive, Kochi =

Promenade in Kochi, India

Marine Drive
- APJ Abdul Kalam Marg
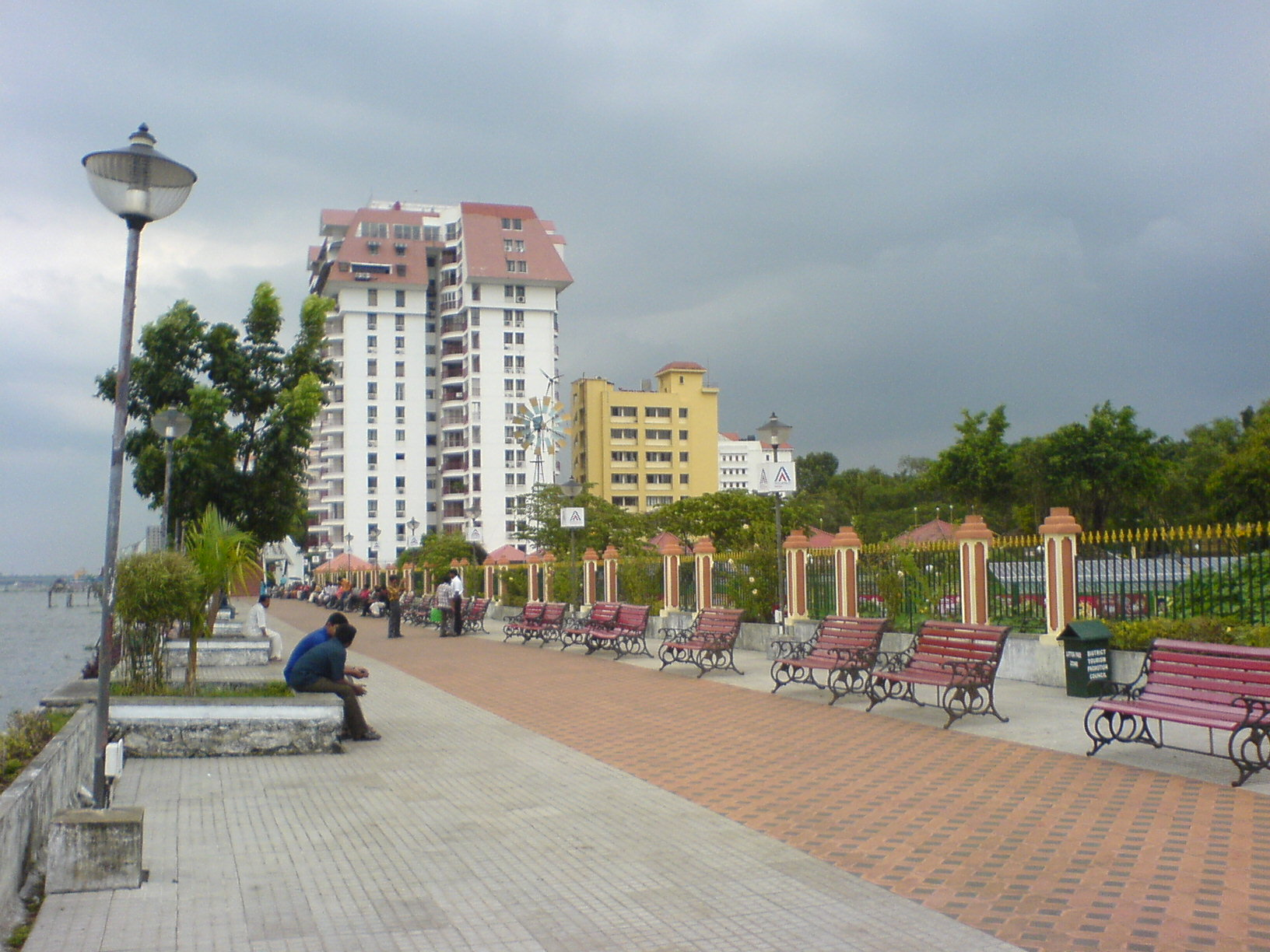
- Interactive map of Marine Drive
- Type: Promenade
- Maintained by: Greater Cochin Development Authority
- Length: 3 km (1.9 mi)
- Addresses: Kochi, India
- Location: Map of Marine Drive
- Postal code: 682011
- Coordinates: 9.980°N 76.275°E

Other
- Known for: Rainbow bridge, Chinese fishing net bridge and Kettuvellam bridge

Marine Drive, officially the APJ Abdul Kalam Marg, is a 3 km (1.86 mi) long promenade in the city of Kochi, India. It is built facing the backwaters and is developed on reclaimed land overlooking the Vembanad Lake system. It is one of Kochi's most recognizable urban landmarks and a major tourist attraction.

The walkway starts from the Kerala High Court junction and continues until the Rajendra Maidan. There are also several boat jetties along the walkway. The walkway has three bridges: the Rainbow bridge, the Chinese Fishing Net Bridge and the House Boat Bridge.

== Name and history ==
Until the 1980s, the Shanmugham Road was the literal marine drive with the Kochi Lake and the adjoining Arabian Sea to its west. In the 1980s, GCDA started the Kochi Marine Drive project (following from the Bombay Marine Drive) and thus the whole of the present Marine Drive (part of the Kochi Lake, west of the Shanmugham Road to the present Marine Walkway) was claimed from the Kochi Lake. The then plan of GCDA was to eventually construct a road on the western border of this land, which would thus become a literal marine drive. But due to the enforcement of the Coastal Protection Laws in India in the 1990s, construction of a road became impossible. That's what led the GCDA toward settling down with a marine walkway instead of an actual marine drive. In 1992, under the leadership of the GCDA Chairman V. Joseph Thomas IPS a beautification project of the walkway was established, leading to the construction of the iconic Rainbow Bridge. But the name Marine Drive, since the initiation of the project in the 1980s, identifies the whole region (which was claimed from the lake), and not just the walkway.

== Places lining Marine Drive ==
The Marine Drive stretches from the Jankar Jetty in the north to the Ernakulam Boat Jetty in the south. The adjoining areas are the Public Ground, Skyline apartments, Federal Bank Building, the GCDA Shopping Complex, the Kerala Trade Centre (under construction), Abad Bay Pride Mall, Pioneer Towers, Hotel Taj Gateway, Alliance Residency, DD Samudra Darshan apartment, and the Indira Priyadarshini Children's Park - in that order from North to South. These buildings and grounds are in between the marine drive walkway and the Shanmugham Road.

The Public Ground at the Northern part of the Marine Drive is the preferred venue for major exhibitions, and more importantly political meetings that mark major landmarks in the Kerala political scene. It was here that the meeting to announce AK Antony's comeback to the Indian National Congress was held in 1982. The GCDA Shopping Complex is a major shopping arcade in Ernakulam city. The latest attraction is kulukki sarbath outlet, which makes local mocktails

Important landmarks on Marine Drive are:

- The Marine Walkway, stretching from Subash Chandra Bose Park in the south, to KSINC Boat Jetty in the north.
- The Rainbow Bridge
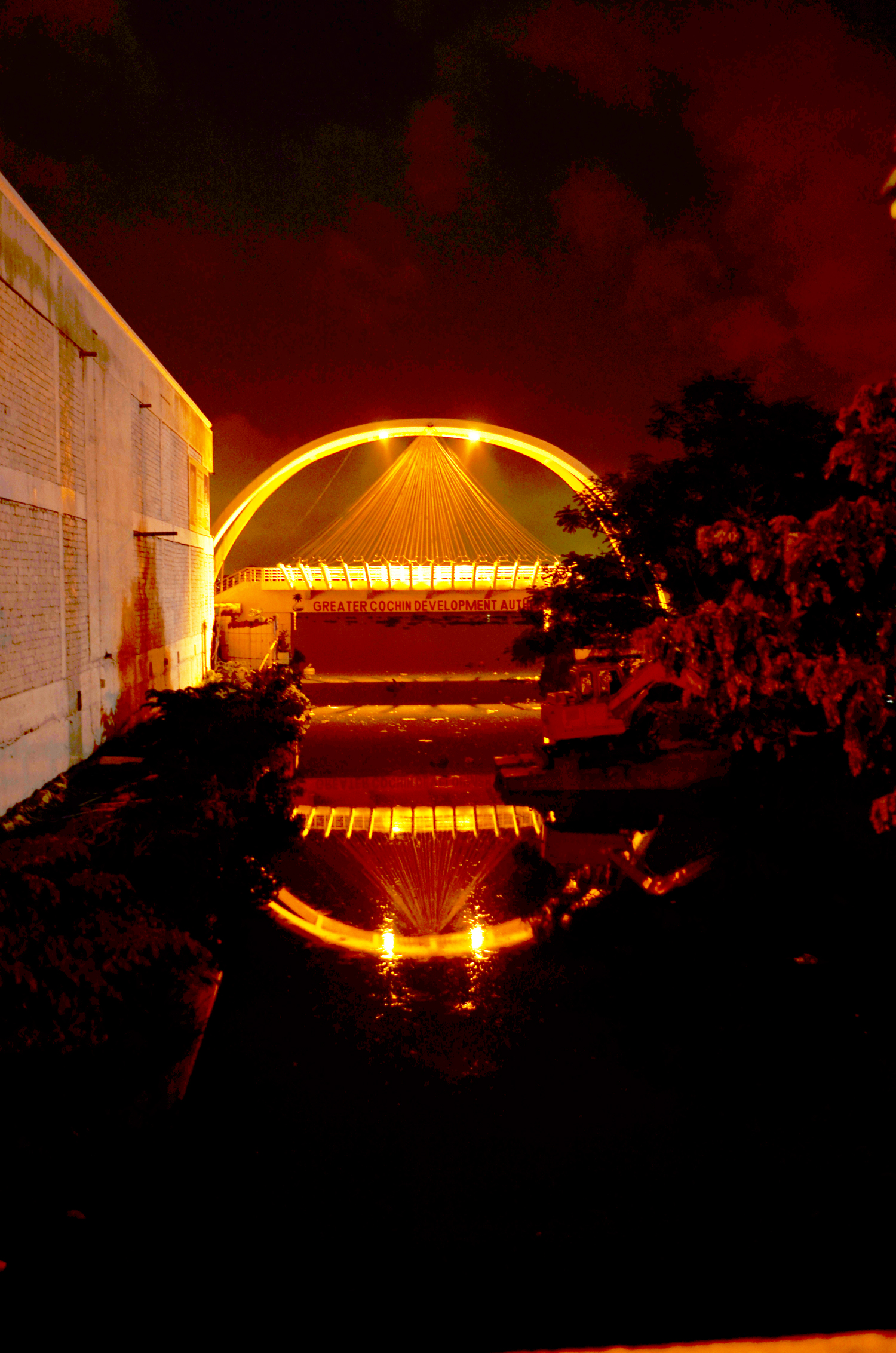
  The Rainbow Bridge at Marine Drive, Kochi
  , over Market Canal near GCDA shopping complex (9.9798°N 76.2750°E).
- The House boat Bridge, part of the Marine Walkway near Goshree bridge end (9.9865°N 76.2715°E).
- The China Net Bridge, over Mullassery canal near Children's park, a part of the Marine Walkway (9.9745°N 76.2775°E).
- GCDA Shopping Complex, along Marine Drive (9.9785°N 76.2763°E).
- The Asoka-Tharangini Apartments
- Marina One Luxury Apartments
- Tata Tritvam Apartments

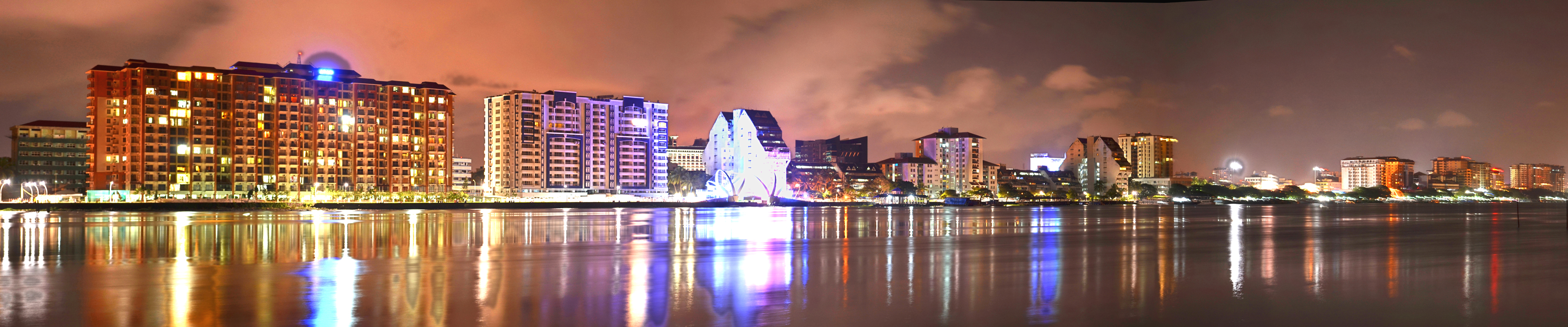
A night view of Marine Drive, Kochi

== Marine Drive Scheme Phase 2 ==
Marine Drive Scheme Phase 2 is an extension of the Phase 1 proposed in the land to be reclaimed of about 400 hect. extending from GIDA land to Varappuzha, as a part of Vision-2030.

== Gallery ==
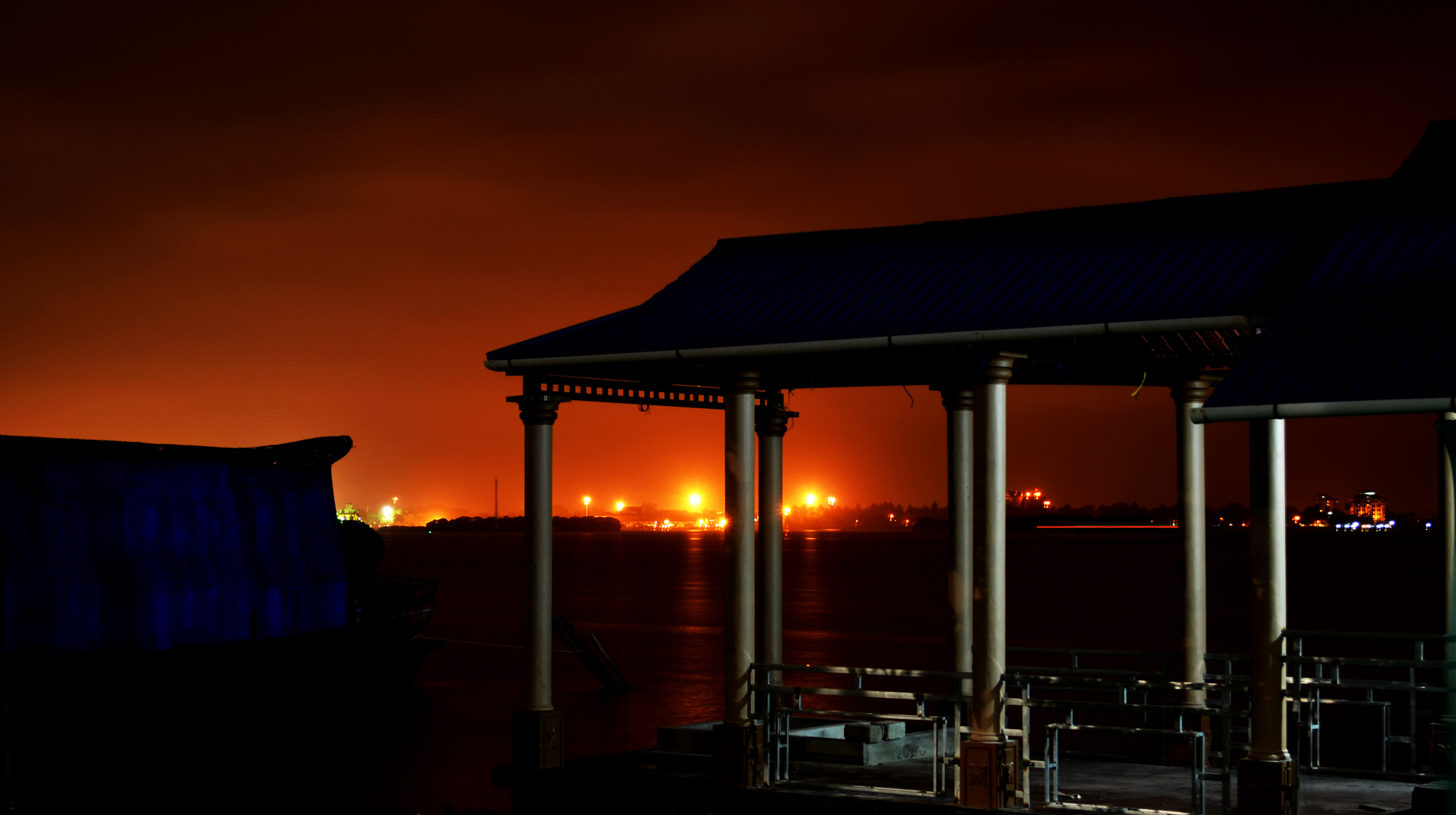
A view from Marine Drive at night

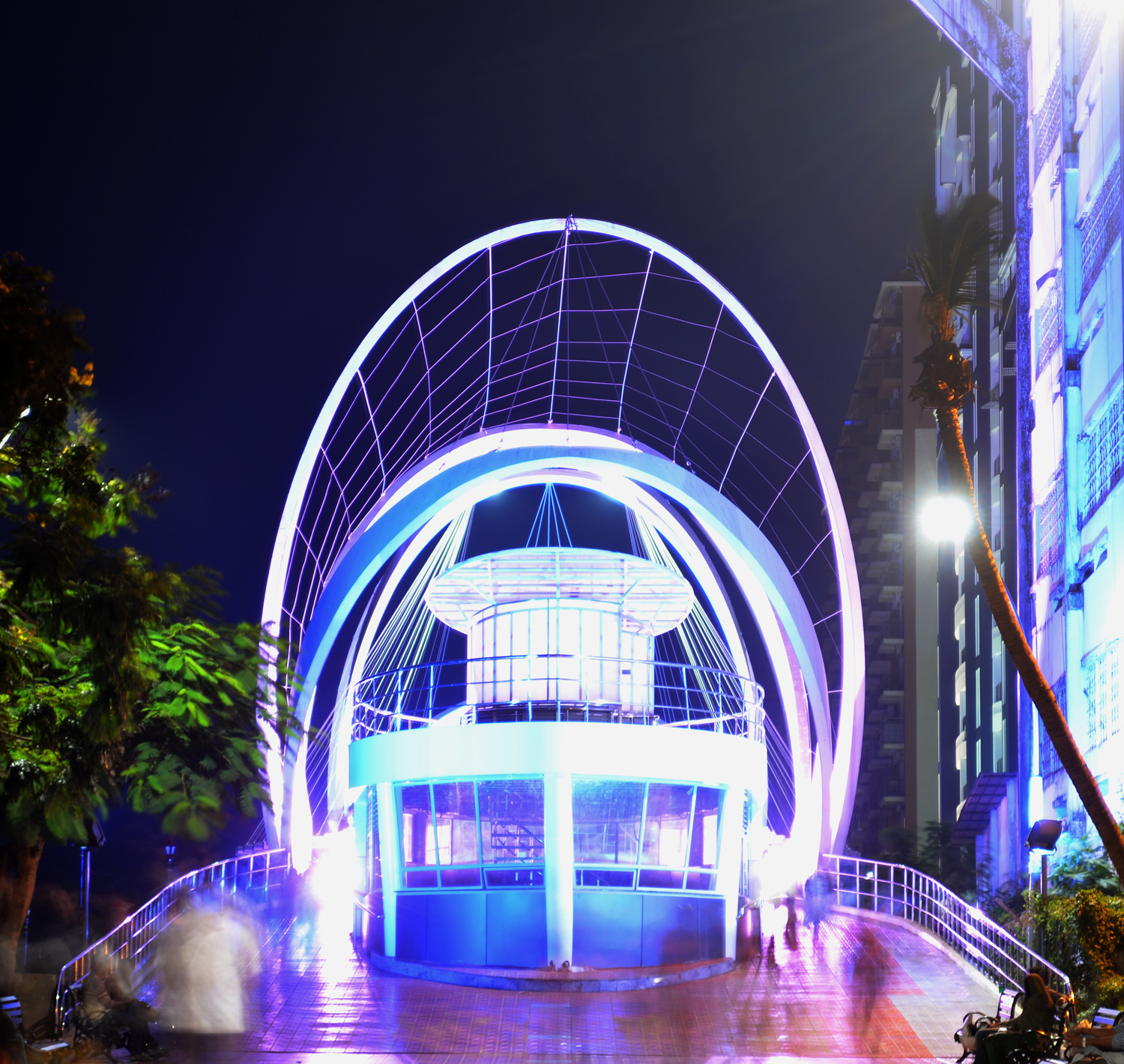
Kettuvallam Bridge near Goshree bridge

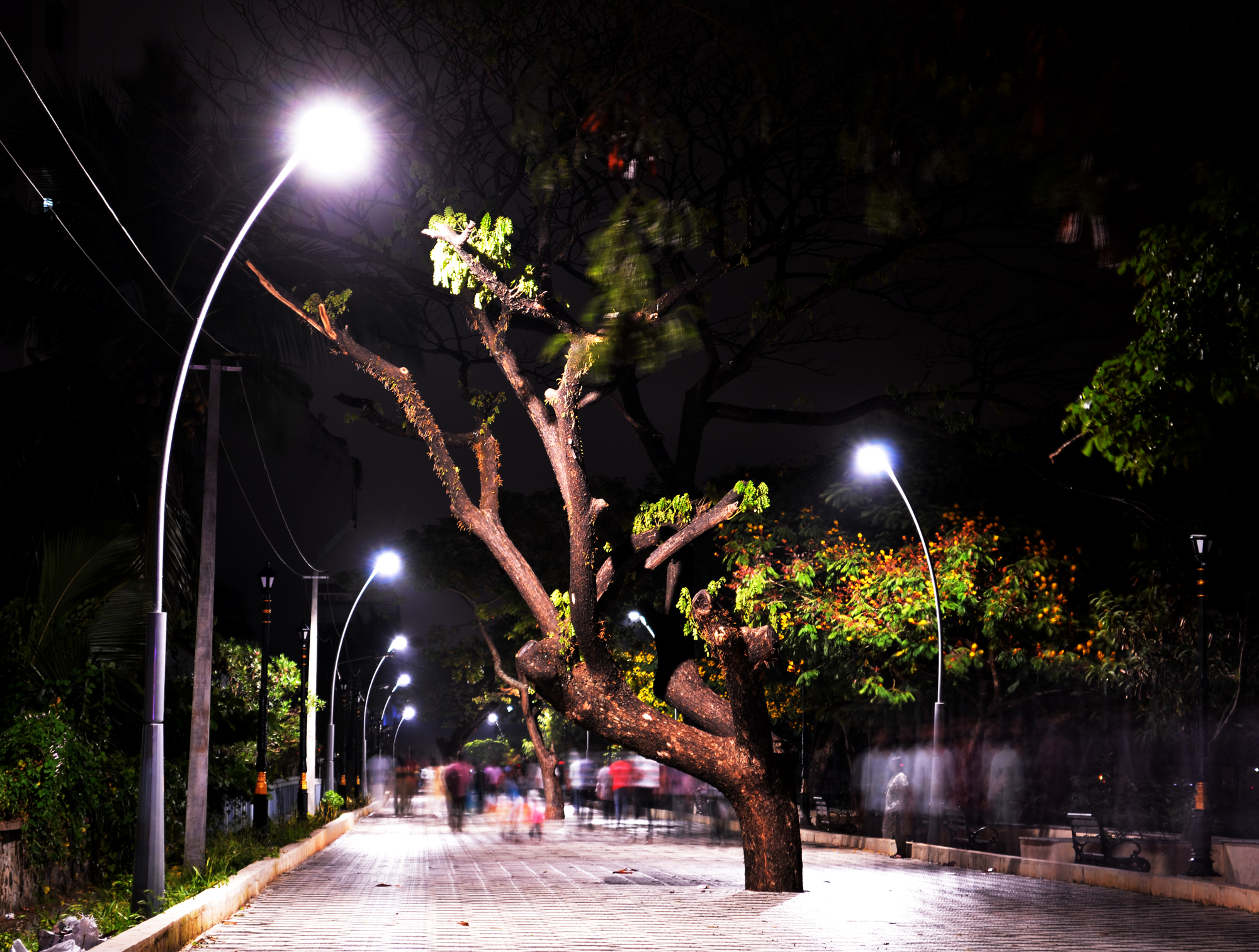
Marine Walkway at night

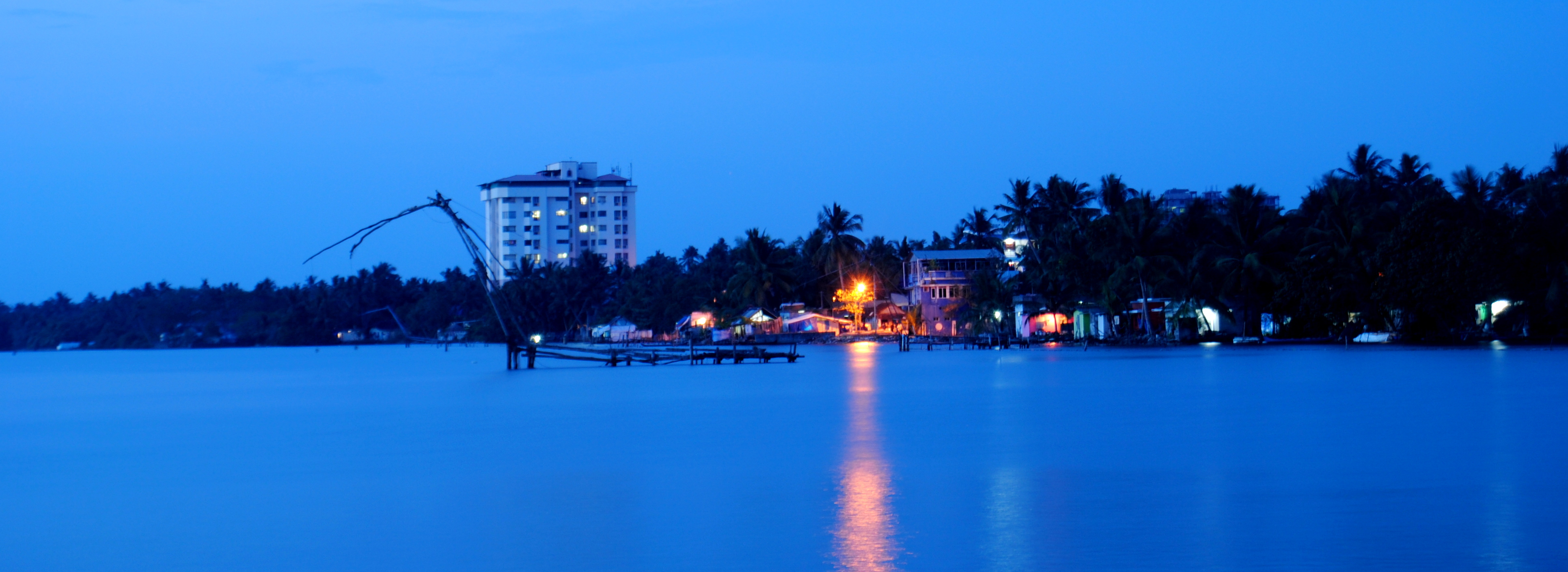
Beauty of Marine Drive at Evening

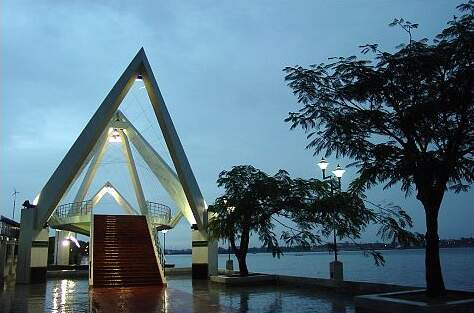
The Chinese Fishing net bridge over Mullassery canal at the Marine Drive walkway

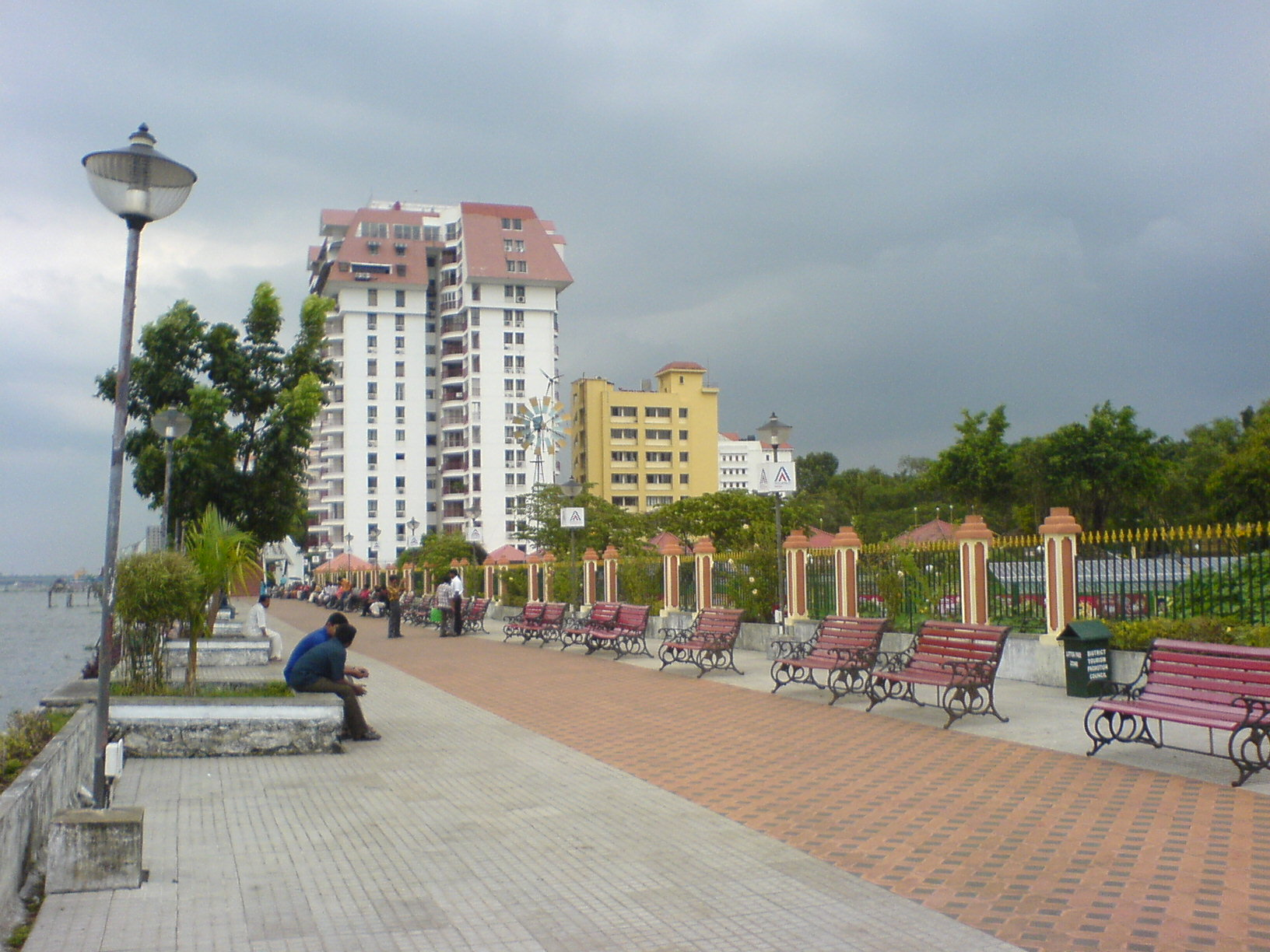
The view from the southern end of the Musical Walkway adjoining the Fishing net Bridge.

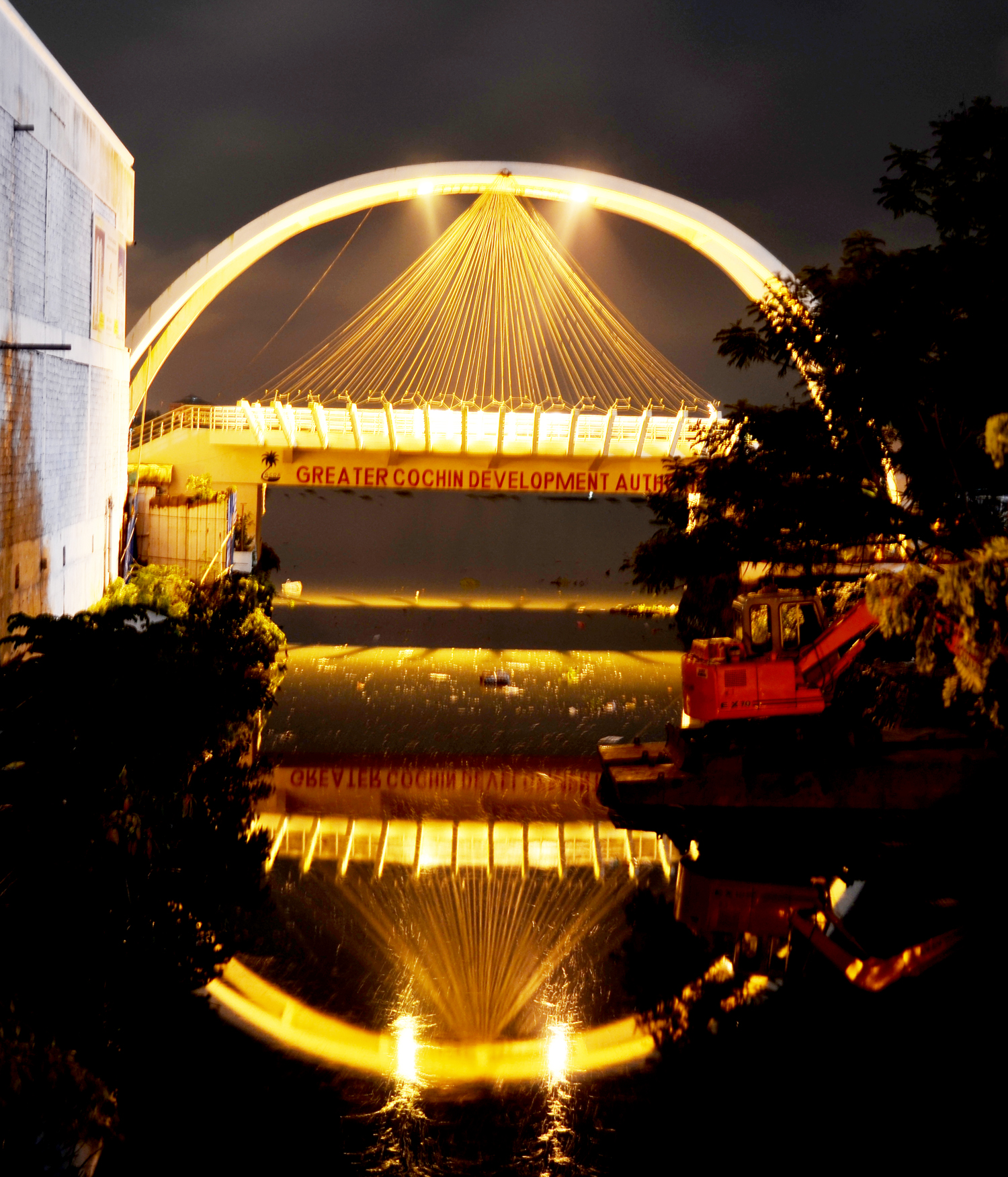
Rainbow Bridge over Market Canal near GCDA shopping complex.

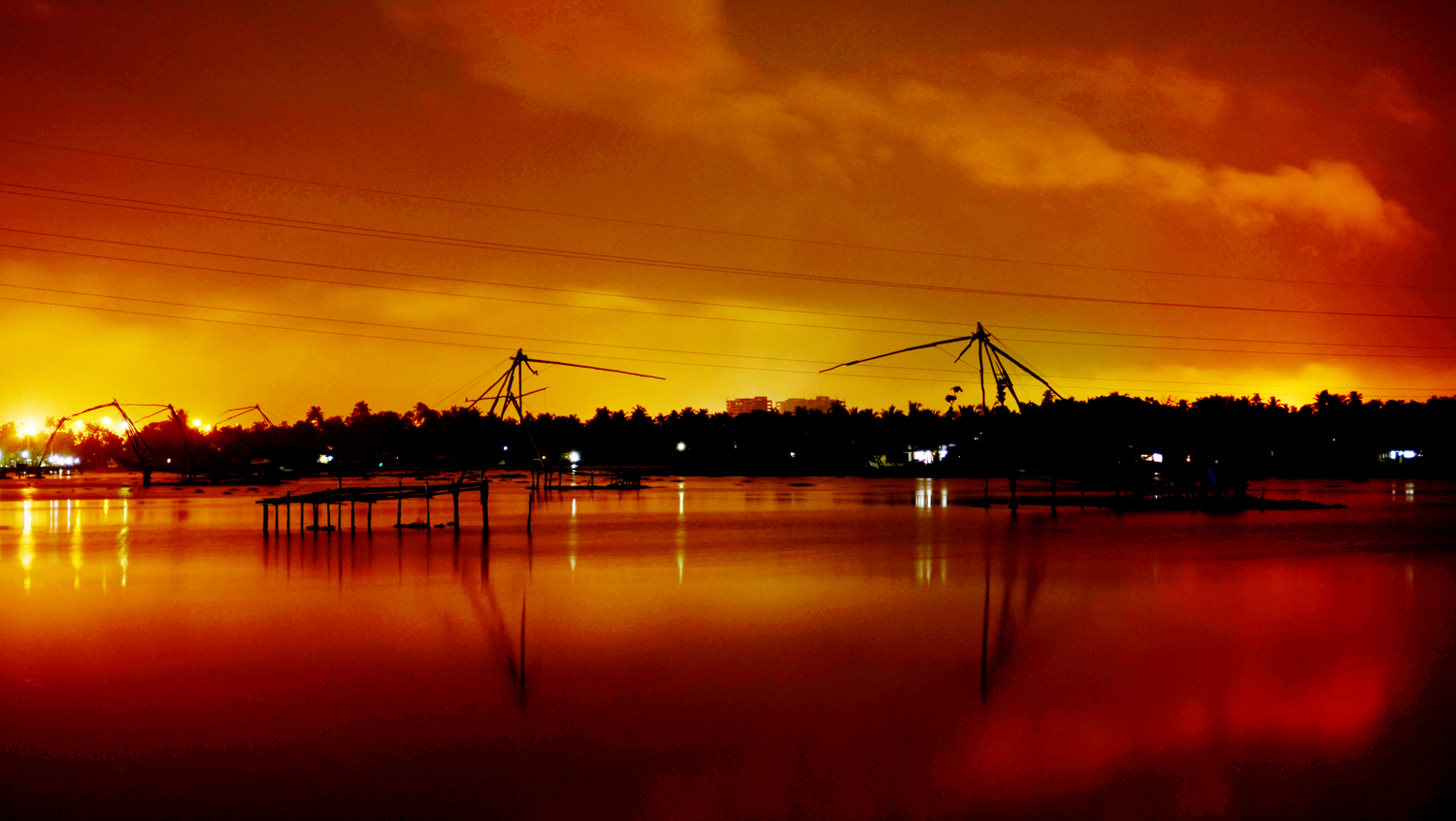
Chinese Net View from Marine Drive

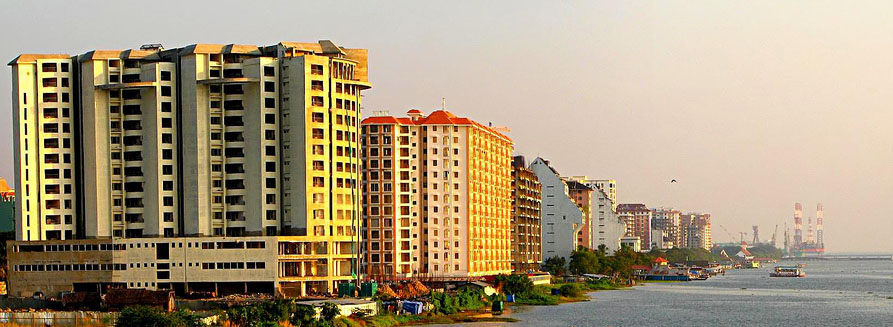
A wide view of the buildings lining the Marine Drive

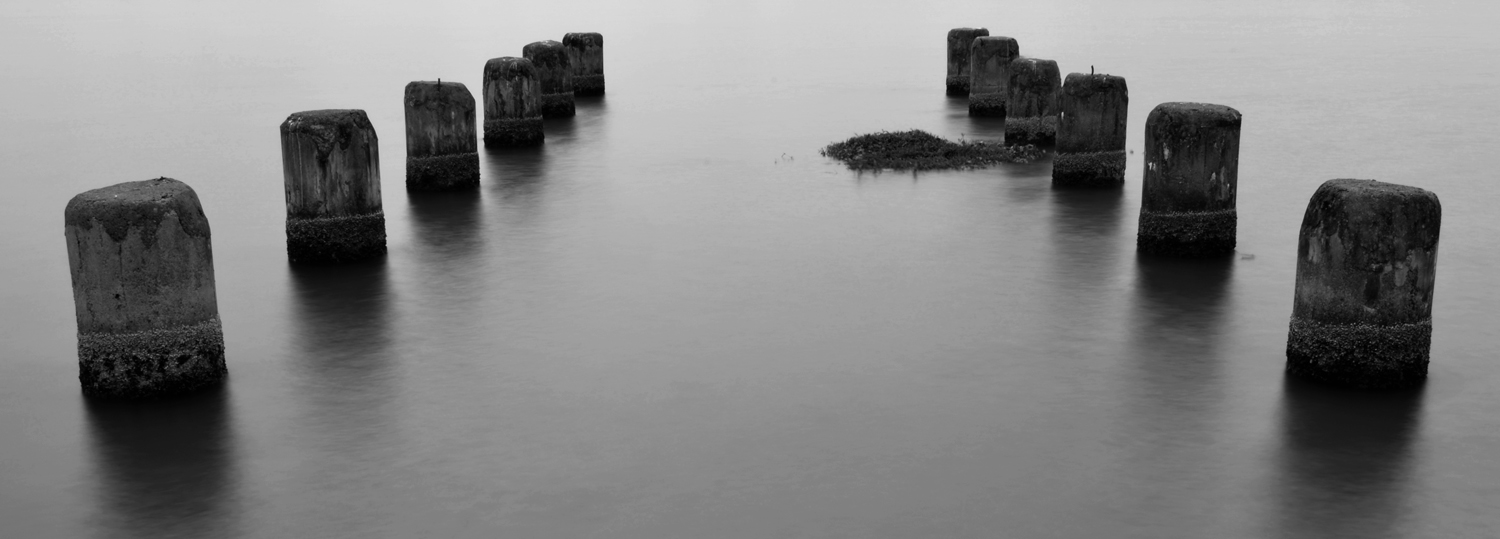
An artistic view from Kochi Marine Drive

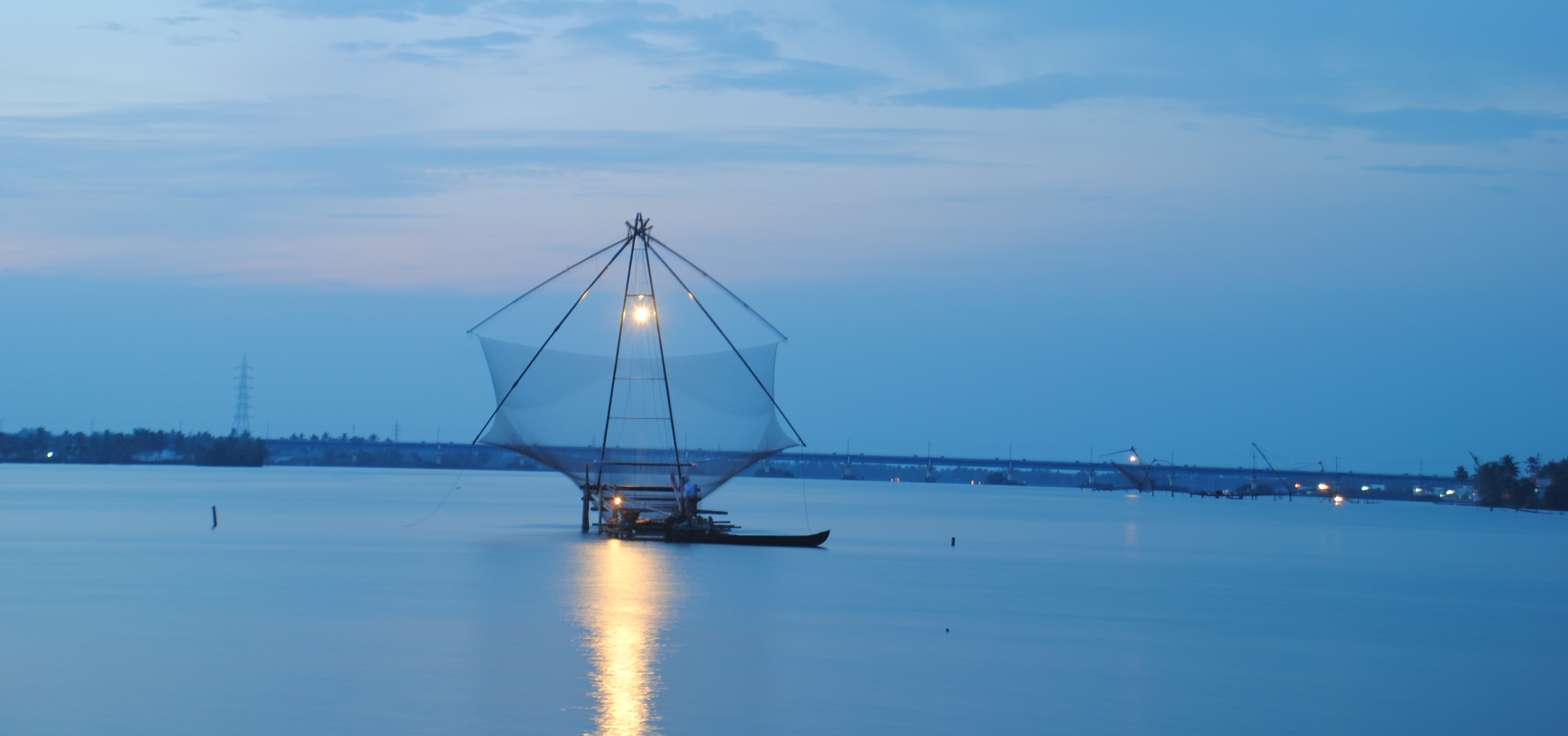
A Holiday Marine Drive View

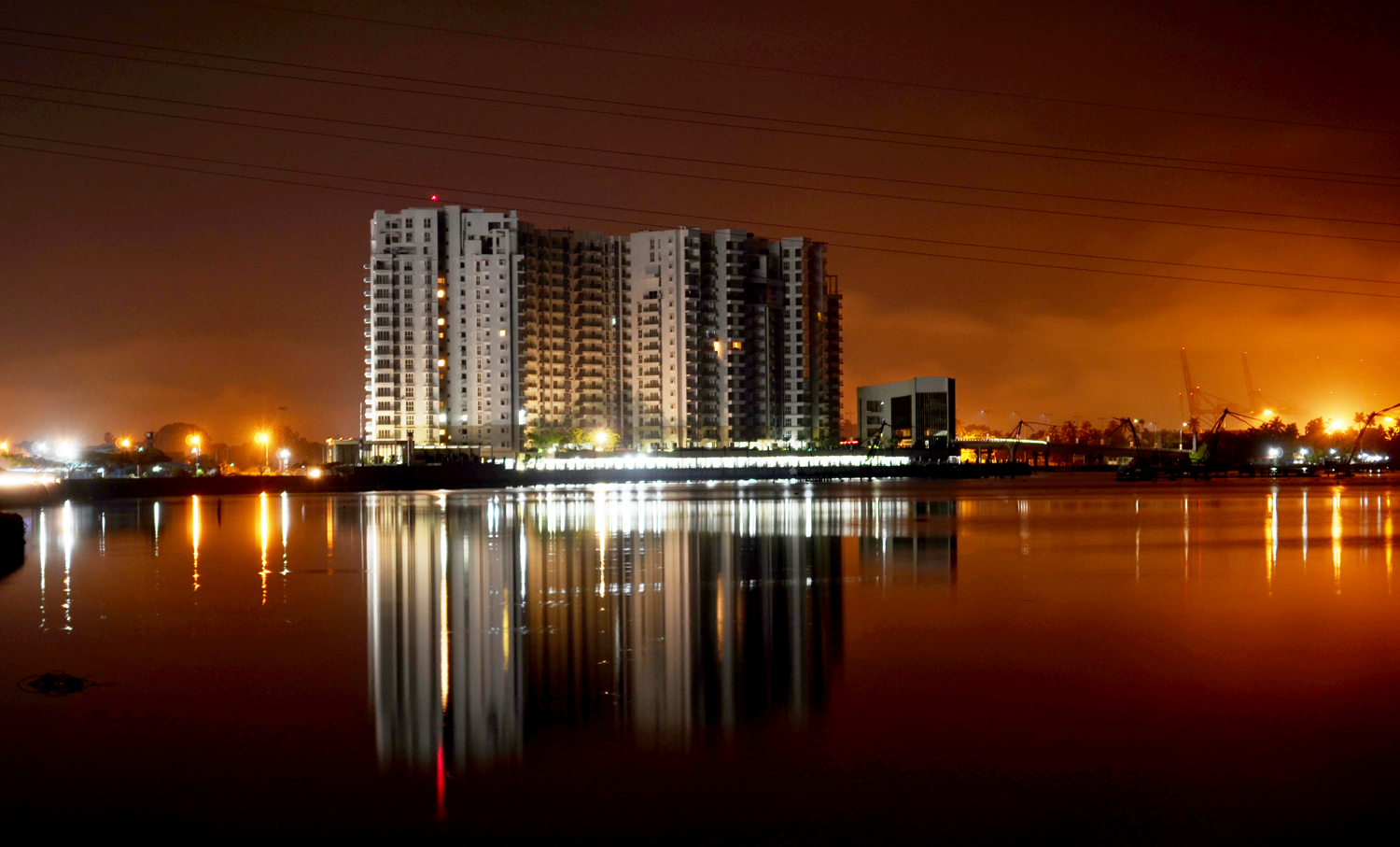
Prestige Apartments at Marine Drive Kochi

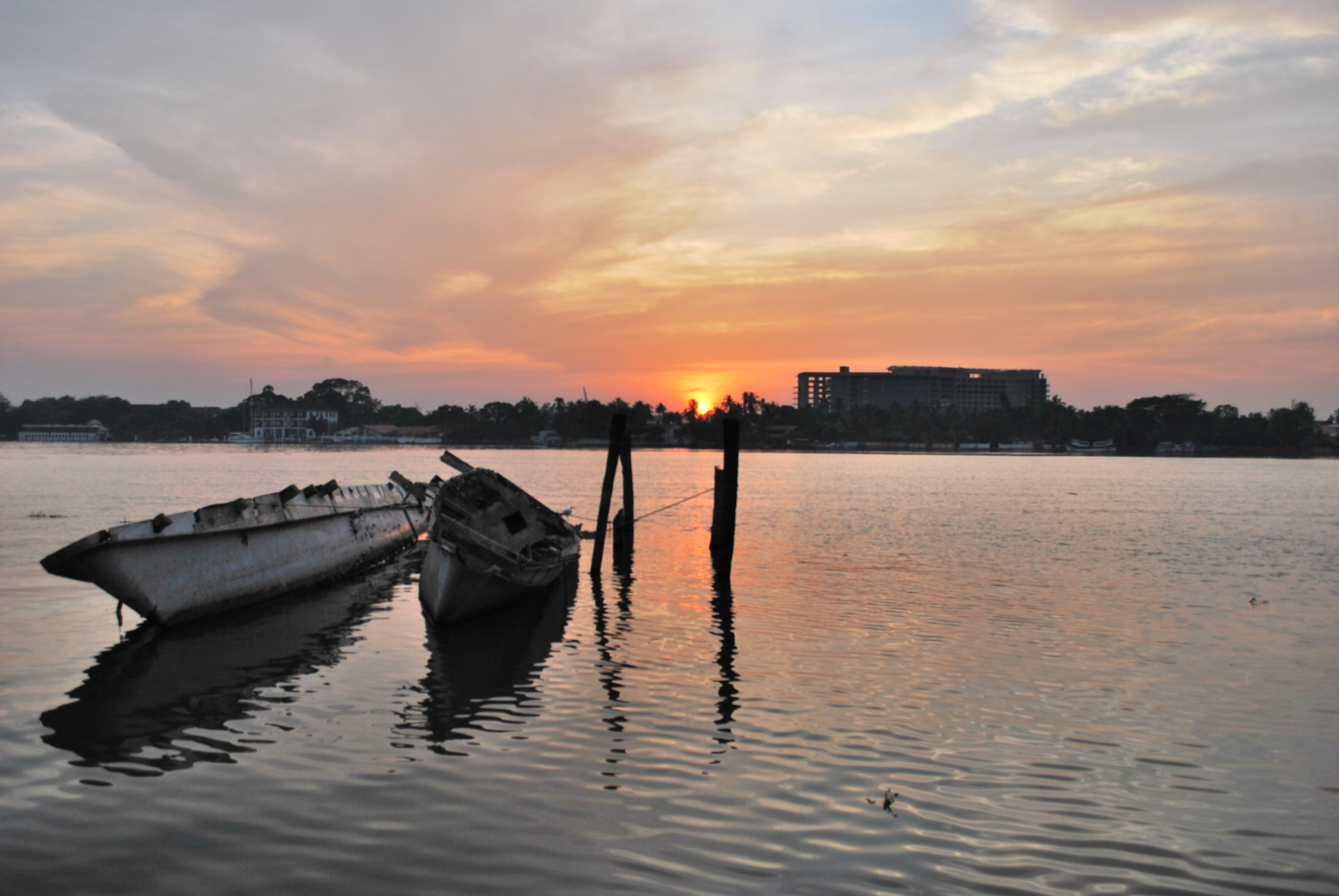
Sunset view from Marine Drive

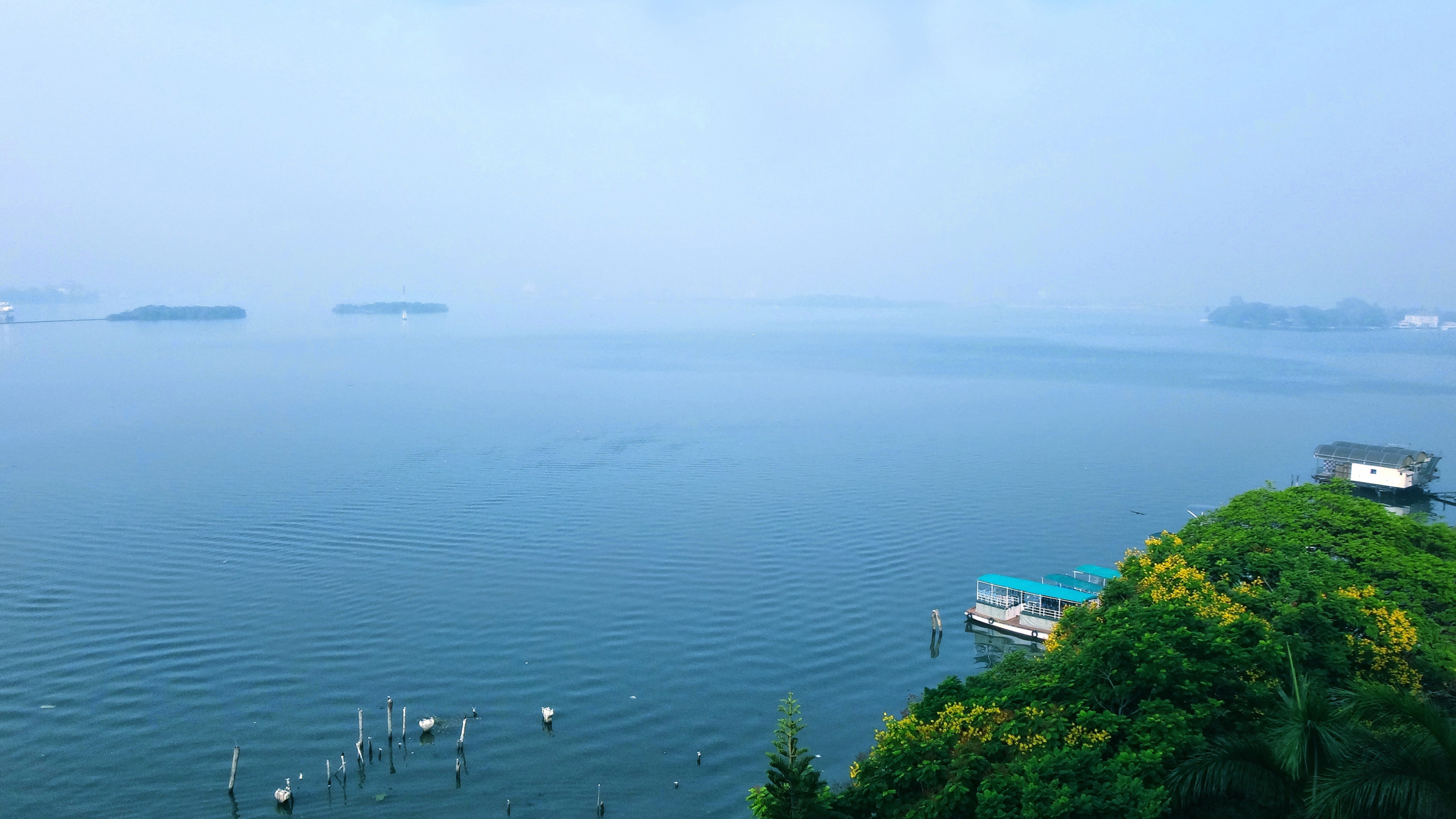
View from a hotel on Marine Drive, Kochi

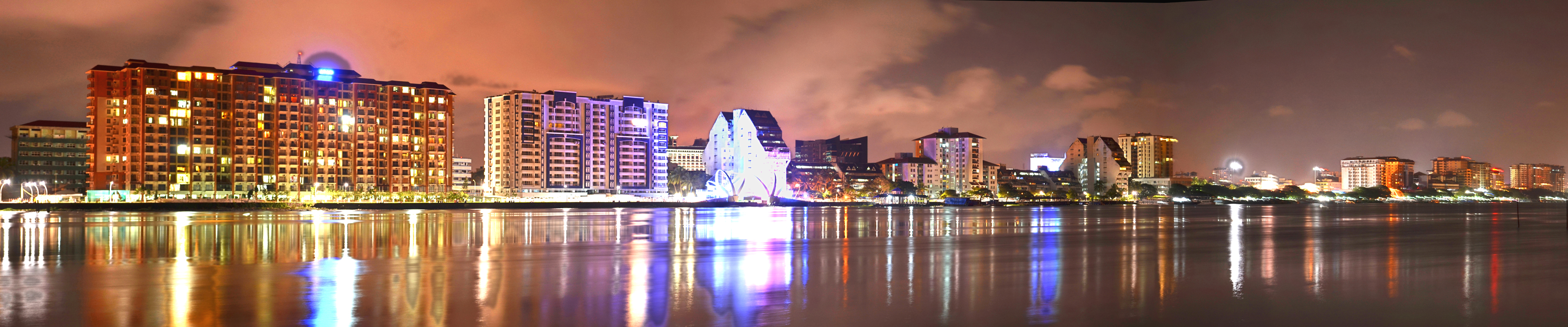
Night view of Marine Drive, Kochi

== See also ==
- Queen's Way
