= Kokers Theatre =

Cinema in Kochi, India

- Address: Amaravathi Road, Amaravathy, Fort Kochi, Kochi, Kerala, India
- Owner: Kochi Municipal Corporation
- Current use: abandoned

Construction
- Opened: 1969 (as Zaina movie house)
- Closed: 27 April 2017
- Years active: 1969–2017

The Kokers Theatre was a cinema theatre located in the South Indian city of Kochi in Kerala, that functioned from 1969 to 2017. One of the oldest cinemas in Kochi, Kokers was the first 70 mm screen in Kerala. It is located in Amaravathy, Fort Kochi and is considered a major landmark in West Kochi.

== History ==
In 1969, film producer T. K. Pareekutty started the Kokers Theatre. At that time, it was known as the Zaina movie house. A 70 mm screen was installed, which was very rare at the time in Kerala. Following Pareekkutty's death, the Kokers Group purchased Zaina movie house and renamed it as Kokers Cinema. They purchased the theatre building. Pareekkutty had leased the site from the then Municipal Corporation. Kokers Group also kept the lease deal going. The lease agreement was extended twice after the first 30-year lease term had ended, first for 10 years and then for another 5 years.

When the lease period was over in 2008, the corporation did not takeover the theatre from Siyad Koker, who managed the theatre, allegedly owing to political pressure. The local body also alleged that the management failed to maintain the theatre properly and for running it with no proper seating, unhygienic toilets, unscientific screening system and unclean premises. The corporation officials secured the building and the theatre complex in 2017 with the assistance of the police, on the grounds that the theatre owners owed the corporation Rs 33 lakh in back taxes. The owner then petitioned the High Court. After a long legal disputes, the court finally ruled to give the ownership rights of the theater to the Kochi Corporation in 2018. Political parties and cultural movements staged several protests demanding the preservation of Kokers Theatre. There were plans to set up a multiplex and cultural centre after settling the financial deals with the lessee.

== See also ==
- Shenoys Theatre
