= Shanmugham Road =

Major arterial road in Kochi, India

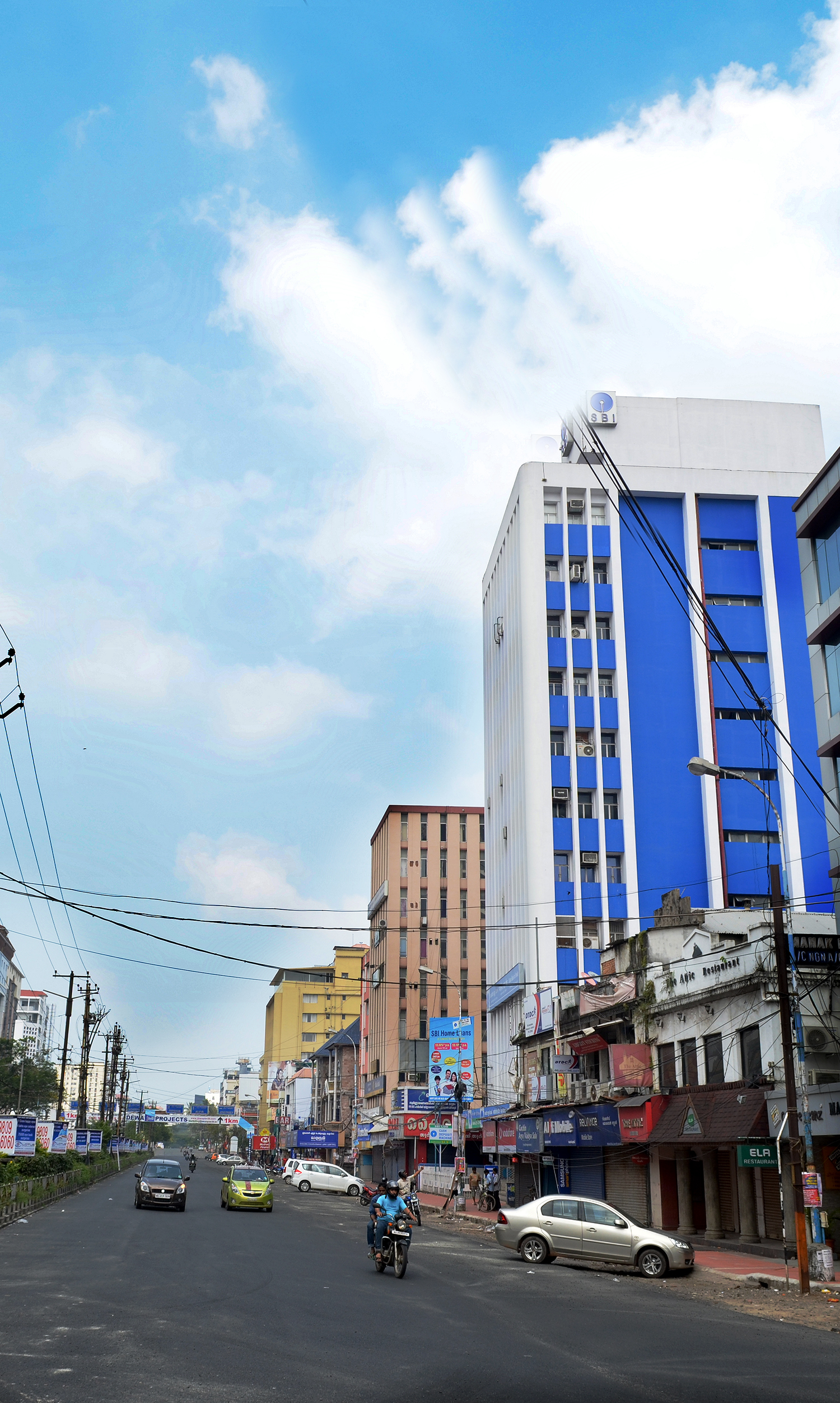

Major junctions
- Banerji Road; Park Avenue

Location
- Country: India
- State: Kerala

Highway system
- Roads in India; Expressways; National; State; Asian; State Highways in Kerala

Shanmugham Road is a major arterial road of the city of Kochi in Kerala, India. Named after R. K. Shanmukham Chetty, the former Diwan of Cochin, the road played an important role in the commercial and administrative development of the city during the twentieth century. Running parallel to Kochi Backwaters and the Marine Drive, it is one of the most commercialised street of the city.

Prior to the development of Marine Drive through land reclamation, Shanmugham Road directly bordered the backwaters and served as a major public promenade. Today, it remains an important urban corridor, connecting key commercial establishments such as Penta Menaka, government offices, transportation facilities, and recreational areas in central Kochi. A tree lined walkway now borders the backwaters, which is a tourist attraction. More than half of the reclaimed land is left as open space, often used for gatherings, demonstrations and shows.

The road begins at the Kerala High Court Junction on the north end and ends at the Kochi Municipal Corporation Guest House near Broadway, Kochi at the south. It continues further south as Park Avenue Road. It is a four lane city road with a wide median separating the two carriageways. The headquarters of the Archdiocese of Verapoly is located on this road, as well as the Regional offices of State Bank of India, Federal Bank and Indian Bank.
