= Ground Zero (13AD album) =

Studio album by 13AD (band)
- Released: 1990
- Recorded: 1989–1990
- Studio: Media Artists P Ltd. Madras, India
- Genre: Hard rock
- Length: 46:52
- Label: Magnasound Records
- Producer: 13AD

13AD (band) chronology
Ground Zero	Tough on the Streets

Ground Zero is the 1990 debut album of Indian band 13AD. The album was widely praised in the Indian press. 13AD was one of India's topmost rock bands from the 1980s to the mid-1990s. The band was formed in 1977. The line up at that time was Stanley Luiz on vocals, Eloy Isaacs on guitar and vocals, Ashley Pinto on guitars and vocals, Anil Raun on bass guitar, and Petro Correia on drums. 13AD used to play in hotel Sea Lord in Kochi, Kerala, India.

They released two albums, Ground Zero and Tough on the Streets in the 1990s. George Thomas Jr. (Viju), who used to jam with the band, urged them to write their own songs. Thomas wrote the songs "Ground Zero" and "Revelations". The song "Ground Zero" from the album Ground Zero was a hit during the 1990s.

== Track listing ==
- All songs written by 13AD, except where noted. Arranged by 13AD.

Cassette side A:

- Bad Taste 5:10
- Ground Zero (George Thomas, Jr.) 5:07
- Desolate Prisoner 4:19
- Your Company 5:14
- Down Deep 3:30

Cassette side B:

- Won’t Give Up 3:21
- Revelation (Thomas, Jr.) 3:39
- Fortune’s Domain 3:40
- Can’t Make Up my Mind 4:23
- City Blues 4:00
- Rocking in Faith 4:19
