= Sealord Hotel =

Hotel in Kochi, Kerala, India

- Interactive map of the Sealord Hotel area

General information
- Location: 9.97879914919936°N 76.27677575620616°E, Shanmugham Road, Kochi, Kerala, India
- Opening: 1967; 59 years ago
- Owner: Sealord Group of Hotels

Sealord Hotel is a hotel situated in the city of Kochi, Kerala, India. Located in the Shanmugham Road, it is a landmark building in Kochi as it is regarded as the first high-rise building in Kerala that was constructed in 1967. It is also believed to be the first concrete-piled building in South India. Sealord Hotel is the first hotel in Kerala to get a three star status.

== See also ==
- Shanmugham Road
