= Penta Menaka =

General information
- Type: Shopping complex
- Location: Shanmugham Road,, Kochi, Kerala, India
- Coordinates: 9.9784°N 76.2773°E

Penta Menaka is one of the busiest commercial shopping hubs in Kochi in the Indian state of Kerala. It is located at the Shanmugham Road.

== Overview ==
Penta Menaka was established on Shanmugham Road in Kochi, at a site formerly occupied by the Menaka cinema theatre, hence came the name Penta Menaka. In the early 1990s, the complex was known for its duty-paid shops, which sold products such as electronic goods, perfumes and toys.

Retail offerings include electronics, mobile accessories, home essentials. For large businesses and bulk buyers, the complex has wholesale shops. Service centers include electronics repair, and mobile servicing.
