= Padma Theatre =

Cinema hall in Kochi, India

- Padma Cinema
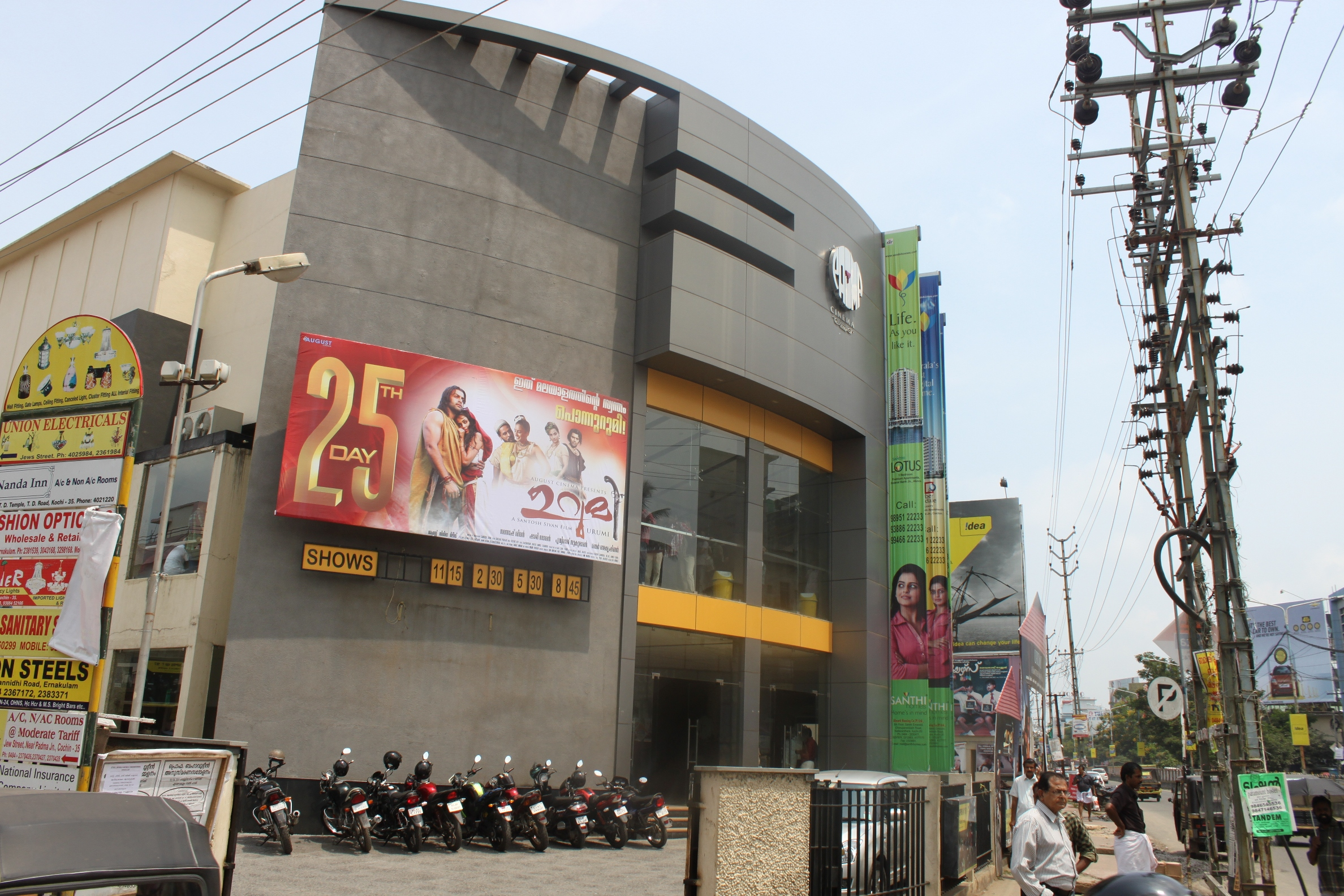
- Padma Theatre in 2011
- Address: Mahatma Gandhi Road, Kochi, Keralam, India
- Owner: Shenoys family

Construction
- Opened: 1946
- Years active: 1946–present

Padma Theatre is a cinema theatre in the South Indian city of Kochi, Keralam. Located in the Mahatma Gandhi Road, it was opened in 1946. It is one of the oldest theatres in Keralam, that is still functioning and the oldest functioning theatre in Kochi. Padma theatre is considered as landmark building in Kochi.

== History ==
Padma theatre was opened in 1946 and was the second theatre from the Shenoy family. Prior to that, Lakshmanan Shenoy had opened the Lakshman theatre in 1944. The theater was named after Lakhman Shenoy's wife. It had a special balcony with 20 seats reserved for the Kochi royal family. Padma was renovated in 1971 and air-conditioned with Photophone film projector. The renovated theatre was opened by Tamil actor Kamal Hassan.

== See also ==
- Shenoys Theatre
- Sridar Theatre
- Sri Padmanabha Theatre
