= Shenoys Theatre =

Multiplex cinema hall in Kochi, India

- Shenoys Cinema
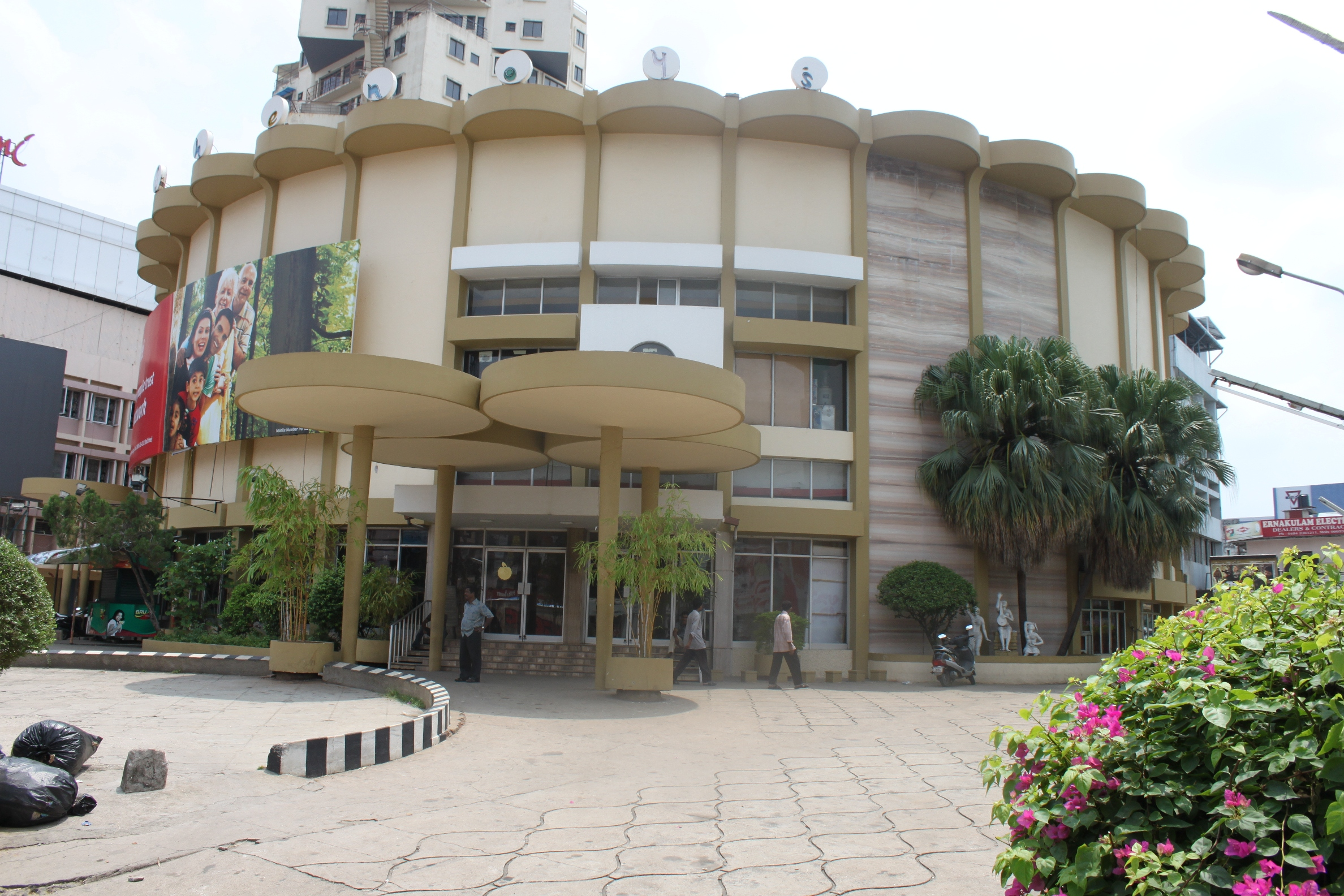
- Shenoys Theatre in 2011
- Address: Mahatma Gandhi Road, Kochi, Kerala, India
- Owner: Shenoys family
- Type: Multiplex

Construction
- Opened: 1969; 57 years ago
- Closed: 2015; 11 years ago (for renovation)
- Reopened: February 2021; 5 years ago
- Rebuilt: 2021; 5 years ago
- Years active: 1969–2015; 2021–present
- Architects: Govinda Rao (old building); Tony Joseph (new building)

Shenoys Theatre is a five-screen multiplex cinema hall in the South Indian city Kochi, Kerala. Located in the Mahatma Gandhi Road, it was opened in 1969 as a single-screen theatre. Until its temporary closure in 2015 for the renovation works, it was billed as one of the largest single-screen theatres in Kerala with a seating capacity for 1250 people. It was reopened in 2021 as a multiplex. Shenoys was the second cinema in Asia to have the Vistarama projection. Known for its circular structure, it is considered a heritage landmark building in Kochi.

== History ==
In 1944, Lakhsmanan Shenoy built the Lakshman Theatre in Kochi, followed by the Padma Theatre in 1946. After constructing Sridhar Theatre in Kochi in 1964, the Shenoy family became known as Kochi's theatre family. Foreigners who came to Sridhar Theatre to watch English movies gave a new concept of Vistarama screen to the Shenoys family. This led to the construction of Shenoys Theatre, the flagship project of eponymous family. The screen was 80 feet long and 30 feet wide. Instead of a flat screen, Shenoy's had a curved inward screen for about 18 feet. Govinda Rao from Chennai was the architect of the theatre, who built the building in accordance with the curved screen of the theatre. The theater also had a six-track stereophonic sound system. It was opened in 1969 by the President of India V.V Giri. The American film Winning was the first movie screened at Shenoys.

In 2015, the theatre was closed for reconstructing it into a multiplex. It underwent extensive renovation lasting over four-five years and was transformed with five multiplex screens, by preserving its monumental circular structure built in the art deco style. Shenoys Theatre was reopened in February 2021 with the screening of Operation Java, Saajan Bakery Since 1962, and Yuvam. The new multiplex has five multiplex screens, including a screen with exclusive recliner seating.

== See also ==
- Kokers Theatre
- Sridar Theatre
- Padma Theatre
- Sarita Savita Sangeeta
- Apsara Theatre
