= Goshree Islands Development Authority =

Goshree Islands Development Authority (GIDA) is a government body established in 1994. It is responsible for the development planning of eight island gram panchayats in Ernakulam district and two wards (Thanthonnithuruthu and Fort Vypeen) of Kochi Municipal Corporation. The GIDA, alongside Greater Cochin Development Authority, are the two government bodies tasked with the development planning of Kochi city and surrounding island panchayats. Its area consists of Vypin Island, Vallarpadam, Bolgatty-Mulavukad Island, Thanthonnithuruthu, Kadamakkudy and islands in Vembanad Lake, covering an area of 100 km^{2}.

== See also ==
- Goshree bridges
